

S

S Diary (2004)
S. Darko (2009)
S.M.A.R.T. Chase (2017)
S.S. Doomtrooper (2006) (TV)
S.W.A.T. (2003)
S.W.A.T.: Firefight (2011)

Sa

Sa Bangji (1988)
Sa Bilis Walang Kaparis (1964)
Sa Dulo ng Baril (1988)
Sa Kabila ng Lahat (1991)
Sa Ngalan ng Ama, Ina at mga Anak (2014)
Sa Paraiso ni Efren (1999)
Sa Pusod ng Dagat (1998)

Saa-Sam

Saa Boo Thiri (2009)
Saadia (1953)
Saagar (1985)
Saajan (1991)
Saajan Bina Suhagan (1978)
Saak (2019)
Saamy (2003)
Saathiya (2002)
Saawariya (2007)
Sabata (1969)
Sabotage: (1936, 1939 & 2014)
Saboteur (1942)
Sabretooth (2002)
Sabrina: (1954 & 1995)
Sabrina the Teenage Witch series:
Sabrina the Teenage Witch (1996 TV)
Sabrina Goes to Rome (1998 TV)
Sabrina, Down Under (1999 TV)
Sabrina: Friends Forever (2002 TV)
Sacco and Vanzetti: (1971 & 2006)
The Sacrament (2013)
Sacred Ground (1983)
The Sacred Spirit (2021)
Sacrifice: (1917, 2000, 2010, 2011, 2016 & 2020)
The Sacrifice: (1909, 1918, 1979, 1986, 2005 & 2020)
Sad Hill Unearthed (2017)
The Sad Sack (1957)
The Saddest Music in the World (2003)
Sade (2000)
Sadie McKee (1934)
Sadie Thompson (1928)
Sadko (1953)
The Sadness (2021)
Sadomania (1981)
Safe: (1995 & 2012)
Safe Haven (2013)
Safe House: (1998 TV & 2012)
Safe Men (1998)
A Safe Place (1971)
Safety (2020)
Safety Last! (1923)
Safety Not Guaranteed (2012)
The Safety of Objects (2001)
The Saga of Gosta Berling (1924)
The Saga of the Viking Women and Their Voyage to the Waters of the Great Sea Serpent (1958)
Sagar (2012)
Sahara: (1919, 1943 American, 1943 Indian, 1958, 1983, 1995 TV, 2005 & 2017)
Saidoweizu (2009)
Sailor Beware (1952)
Sailor Beware! (1956)
Sailor Moon series:
Sailor Moon R: The Movie (1993)
Sailor Moon S: The Movie (1994)
Sailor Moon Super S: The Movie (1995)
Sailor Suit and Machine Gun (1981)
Sailor Suit and Machine Gun: Graduation (2016)
The Sailor Who Fell from Grace with the Sea (1976)
Sailors, Beware! (1927)
Saimin (1999)
The Saint RKO series:
The Saint in London (1939)
The Saint in New York (1938)
The Saint in Palm Springs (1941)
The Saint Meets the Tiger (1943)
The Saint Strikes Back (1939)
The Saint Takes Over (1940)
The Saint's Double Trouble (1940)
The Saint's Return (1953)
The Saint's Vacation (1941)
The Saint: (1941, 1997 & 2017)
Saint Ange (2004)
Saint Frances (2019)
Saint Joan: (1957 & 1967 TV)
Saint John of Las Vegas (2009)
Saint Maud (2019)
Saint Ralph (2005)
Saint-Ex (1997)
Saint-Narcisse (2020)
A Saintly Switch (1999)
Saints and Soldiers (2004)
Saippuaprinssi (2006)
Saki (2017)
Salaam Bombay! (1988)
Salaam Namaste (2005)
Salakhain (2004)
Salangeul chajaseo (1929)
Salem's Lot (1979) (TV)
Salesman (1969)
The Salesman: (2011 & 2016)
Sally: (1925, 1929 & 2000)
Salmon Fishing in the Yemen (2011)
Salò, or the 120 Days of Sodom (1975)
Salome of the Tenements (1925)
Salome's Last Dance (1988)
Salomé: (1918, 1923 & 1953)
Salon Kitty (1976)
Saloum (2021)
Salt: (1987, 2006, 2009 & 2010)
The Salt of the Earth (2014)
Salt of the Earth (1954)
Salt and Pepper (1968)
The Salton Sea: (2002 & 2016)
Saludos Amigos (1943)
Salvador: (1986 & 2006)
Salvador Dalí (1971)
The Salvation (2014)
Salvatore Giuliano (1962)
Salvatore: Shoemaker of Dreams (2020)
Salween (1994)
Samaritan (2022)
The Samaritan (2012)
Samaritan Girl (2004)
Same Kind of Different as Me (2017)
Same Old Song (1997)
Same Time, Next Year (1979)
Sami Blood (2016)
Le Samouraï (1967)
Sampo (1959)
Samsara: (2001 & 2011)
Samson: (1914, 1915, 1923, 1936, 1961 Polish, 1961 Italian & 2018)
Samson and Delilah: (1922, 1949, 1984, 1996 TV & 2009)
Samson and His Mighty Challenge (1964)
Samson and the Sea Beast (1963)
Samson and the Seven Miracles of the World (1961)
Samson and the Slave Queen (1963)
Samurai Assassin (1965)
Samurai Cop (1991)
Samurai Cop 2: Deadly Vengeance (2015)
Samurai Fiction (1998)
Samurai Hustle (2014)
Samurai Hustle Returns (2016)
Samurai Rebellion (1967)
Samurai Reincarnation (1981)
Samurai Spy (1965)
Samurai Trilogy series:
Samurai I: Musashi Miyamoto (1954)
Samurai II: Duel at Ichijoji Temple (1955)
Samurai III: Duel at Ganryu Island (1956)

San-Say

San Andreas (2015)
San Francisco: (1936 & 1968)
Sanada 10 Braves (2016)
Sanctum (2011)
The Sand Pebbles (1966)
Sanders of the River (1935)
The Sandlot (1993)
The Sandlot 2 (2005)
The Sandlot: Heading Home (2007)
The Sandman: (1991, 2000, 2011 & 2017 TV)
Sandor / Ida (2005)
The Sandpiper (1965)
Sands of Iwo Jima (1949)
Sands of the Kalahari (1965)
The Sands of Kurobe (1968)
Sangam: (1964 Hindi, 1964 Urdu & 1997)
Sango-sho Densetsu: Aoi Umi no Erufii (1986)
Sanitation Day (2021)
Sanjuro (1962)
Sankaku (2010)
Sans Soleil (1983)
Sanshiro Sugata (1943)
Sanshiro Sugata Part II (1945)
Sansho the Bailiff (1954)
Santa Claus: (1898 & 1959)
Santa Claus Is Comin' to Town (1970)
Santa Claus Conquers the Martians (1964)
Santa Claus and the Magic Drum (1996) (TV)
Santa Claus vs. Cupid (1915)
Santa Claus: The Movie (1985)
The Santa Clause series:
The Santa Clause (1994)
The Santa Clause 2 (2002)
The Santa Clause 3: The Escape Clause (2006)
Santa Fe Trail (1940)
Santa Fe Uprising (1946)
Santa and the Ice Cream Bunny (1972)
Santa with Muscles (1996)
Santa Sangre (1989)
Santa vs. the Snowman 3D (2002)
Santa Who? (2000)
Santa's Little Helper (2015)
Santa's Slay (2005)
Santa's Workshop (1932)
Santo Contra los Zombis (1961)
The Sap: (1926 & 1929)
Sapphire (1959)
Saps at Sea (1940)
Saraba Abunai Deka (2016)
Saraband (2003 TV)
The Saragossa Manuscript (1965)
Sarah Silverman: Jesus Is Magic (2005)
Sarah and Son (1930)
Sarah's Choice (2009)
Sarah's Key (2011)
Sarajevo: (1940 French, 1940 Hungarian, 1955 & 2014 TV)
Saratoga Trunk (1945)
Sardaar Ji (2015)
Sarfarosh (1998)
Sarkar series:
Sarkar: (2005 & 2014)
Sarkar 3 (2017)
Sarkar Raj (2008)
Sarraounia (1986)
SARS Wars (2004)
Sartana's Here… Trade Your Pistol for a Coffin (1970)
Sasidharan (1950)
The Satan Bug (1965)
Satan Met a Lady (1936)
Satan Never Sleeps (1962)
Satan's Cheerleaders (1977)
Satan's Little Helper (2004)
Satan's School for Girls (2000)
Satan's Slave: (1976 & 1980)
Satan's Slaves (2017)
Satan's Sword (1960)
Satanic (2016)
The Satanic Rites of Dracula (1973)
Satánico pandemonium  (1975)
Sátántangó (1994)
Sathya: (1988, 2010, 2017 Malayalam & 2017 Tamil)
Sathyam: (1980 & 2004)
Satomi Hakkenden (1983)
Sator (2019)
Saturday (1945)
Saturday the 14th (1981)
Saturday the 14th Strikes Back (1988)
Saturday Fiction (2019)
Saturday Morning Mystery (2012)
Saturday Night: (1922, 1950 & 2010)
Saturday Night Fever (1977)
Saturday Night and Sunday Morning (1960)
Saturn 3 (1980)
Satya: (1998 & 2017)
Satyam: (1976, 2003 & 2008)
Satyricon: (1969 Fellini & 1969 Polidoro)
Sauerbruch – Das war mein Leben (1954)
Sausage Party (2016)
Le Saut à la couverture (1895)
Sauve qui peut (la vie) (1980)
Savage: (1973 TV & 2009)
The Savage: (1917, 1926 & 1952)
Savage! (1973)
Savage Beach (1989)
Savage Grace (2007)
Savage Harvest (1981)
The Savage Innocents (1959)
Savage Messiah: (1972 & 2002)
Savage Planet (2006) (TV)
Savage Salvation (2022)
Savage Sisters (1974)
Savage Streets (1984)
Savage Weekend (1976)
The Savages (2008)
Savages: (1972, 1974 TV & 2012)
Save the Date (2012)
Save the Green Planet! (2003)
Save the Last Dance (2001)
Save Ralph (2021)
Save the Tiger (1973)
Saved! (2004)
The Saved (1998)
Saved from the Titanic (1912)
Saving Face: (2004 & 2012)
Saving General Yang (2013)
Saving Grace: (1986, 1998 & 2000)
Saving Grace B. Jones (2009)
Saving Mr. Banks (2013)
Saving My Hubby (2002)
Saving Private Ryan (1998)
Saving Silverman (2001)
Saving Star Wars (2004)
Saving Zoë (2019)
Savior (1998)
The Savior: (1971 & 2014)
Saw series:
Saw: (2003 & 2004)
Saw II (2005)
Saw III (2006)
Saw IV (2007)
Saw V (2008)
Saw VI (2009)
Saw 3D (2010)
Jigsaw (2017)
Spiral (2021)
Sawdust and Tinsel (1953)
Sax Rohmer's The Castle of Fu Manchu (1972)
Say Amen, Somebody (1982)
Say Anything... (1989)
Say It Isn't So (2001)
Say Uncle (2006)
Say Yes (2001)
Sayew (2003)
Sayonara (1957)
Sayonara (2015)
Sayonara Midori-chan (2005)

Sca

Scaffolding (2017)
Scalawag (1973)
Scales (2019)
Scalp Trouble (1939)
Scalpel (1977)
Scalpel, Please (1985)
The Scalphunters (1968)
Scalps (1983)
Scam (1993 TV)
The Scam (2009)
Scampolo: (1928, 1932, 1941 & 1958)
Scandal: (1917, 1929, 1950, 1989 & 2012)
The Scandal: (1923, 1934 & 1943)
Scandal in Bad Ischl (1957)
Scandal in Baden-Baden (1929)
Scandal in Budapest (1933)
Scandal at the Embassy (1950)
Scandal in the Family: (1967 & 1975)
Scandal at the Fledermaus (1936)
Scandal at the Girls' School (1953)
Scandal Incorporated (1956)
Scandal Maker (2016)
Scandal Makers (2008)
A Scandal in Paris (1946)
Scandal on Park Street (1932)
Scandal Proof (1925)
Scandal for Sale (1932)
Scandal at Scourie (1953)
Scandal Sheet: (1931, 1939, 1952 & 1985 TV)
Scandal in a Small Town (1988 TV)
Scandal in Sorrento (1955)
Scandal Street: (1925 & 1938)
Scandale (1982)
Scandalo in famiglia (1976)
Scandalous (1984)
The Scandalous Adventures of Buraikan (1970)
Scandalous Eva (1930)
Scandalous Gilda (1985)
Scandalous John (1971)
Scanner Cop (1994)
A Scanner Darkly (2006)
Scanners (1981)
Scanners II: The New Order (1991)
Scanners III: The Takeover (1992)
Scanners: The Showdown (1995)
The Scapegoat: (1912, 1959, 2011, 2012 & 2013)
Scar (2007)
The Scar: (1919 & 1976)
The Scar of Shame (1929)
Scaramouche (1952)
Scare Me (2020)
Scarecrow: (1973, 1984, 2002, 2013 TV & 2020)
The Scarecrow: (1920, 1982, 2000 & 2013)
Scarecrow Gone Wild (2004)
The Scarecrow of Romney Marsh (1963)
Scarecrows (1988)
Scared to Death (1947)
Scared Stiff: (1945, 1953 & 1987)
Scared Straight! (1978)
Scaredy Cat (1948)
The Scarehouse (2014)
Scarface: (1932 & 1983)
The Scarlet and the Black (1983) (TV)
The Scarlet Claw (1944)
Scarlet Diva (2000)
The Scarlet Empress (1934)
The Scarlet Letter: (1908, 1911, 1913, 1922, 1926, 1934, 1973, 1995 & 2004)
The Scarlet Pimpernel: (1934 & 1982)
The Scarlet Pumpernickel (1950)
Scarlet Road (2011)
The Scarlet Runner (1916)
Scarlet Sails (Алые Паруса) (1961)
Scarlet Street (1945)
Scars of Dracula (1970)
Scary Godmother: The Revenge of Jimmy (2005)
Scary Movie series:
Scary Movie (2000)
Scary Movie 2 (2001)
Scary Movie 3 (2003)
Scary Movie 4 (2006)
Scary Movie 5 (2013)
Scary Road Is Fun (2015)
The Scary of Sixty-First (2021)
Scary Stories to Tell in the Dark (2019)
Scavenger Hunt (1979)

Sce
 
The Scene of the Crash (1971)
Scene of the Crime: (1949, 1986 & 1996)
Scene No. 7 (1985)
Scene Onnu Nammude Veedu (2012)
A Scene at the Sea (1991)
Scenes of City Life (1935)
Scenes from the Class Struggle in Beverly Hills (1989)
Scenes of the Crime (2001)
Scenes from a Gay Marriage (2012)
Scenes from the Goldmine (1987)
Scenes from a Mall (1991)
Scenes from a Marriage (1973) (TV)
Scenes of a Sexual Nature (2006)
Scenes from Under Childhood (1967–70)
The Scenesters (2009)
Scenic Route (2013)
The Scenic Route (1978)
The Scent (2012)
The Scent of Blood (2004)
The Scent of Burning Grass (2012)
The Scent of Green Papaya (1994)
The Scent of Incense (1964)
Scent of Love (2003)
A Scent of the Matterhorn (1961)
Scent of Mystery (1960)
The Scent of the Night (1998)
The Scent of Rain and Lightning (2017)
Scent of a Woman: (1974 & 1992)
Scent-imental Over You (1947)
Scent-imental Romeo (1951)
The Sceptre and the Mace (1957)

Sch

Schapelle (2014 TV)
Schatten – Eine nächtliche Halluzination (1923)
Scheherazade (2018)
Scheherazade, Tell Me a Story (2009)
Scheherazade's Diary (2013)
Scheme Birds (2019)
Schemers (2019)
The Schemers (1916)
Scheming Schemers (1956)
Schiava del peccato (1954)
Schichlegruber - Doing the Lambeth Walk (1942)
Schiele in Prison (1980)
Schindler's List (1993)
Schizo (1976)
Schozoid (1980)
Schizophrenia (1997)
Schizopolis (1996)
Schlager (1979)
Schlock (1973)
Schmutz (1985)
Schnitzel (2014)
Schnitzel Paradise (2005)
School Begins (1928)
School Bus (2016)
School of Champions (1950)
School for Coquettes: (1935 & 1958)
School Dance (2014)
School for Danger (1947)
School Daze (1988)
School Days: (1920, 1921 & 1995)
School Days with a Pig (2008)
School Diary (2018)
School on Fire (1988)
The School of Flesh (1998)
School Ghost Stories (1995)
School Ghost Stories 3 (1997)
School for Girls (1935)
School of the Holy Beast (1974)
School for Husbands (1937)
School Is Over (2010)
School Life: (2016 & 2019)
School of Life: (2003 & 2005)
School for Love (1955)
School in the Mailbox (1947)
School for Marriage (1954)
School Master: (1958, 1959, 1964, 1973 & 2010)
School for Models (1949)
School for Postmen (1947)
School for Randle (1949)
School of Rock (2003)
School for Scoundrels: (1960 & 2006)
School for Secrets (1946)
School for Seduction (2004)
School for Sex (1969)
School Spirit (1985)
School for Stars (1935)
School for Suicide (1964)
School Ties (1992)
School for Tramps (1955)
School Trip (2002)
School Waltz (1978)
School for Wives (1925)
School-Live! (2019)
School's Out: (1930, 1992 & 2018)
Schooled: The Price of College Sports (2013)
Schoolgirl Apocalypse (2011)
Schoolgirl Diary (1941)
Schoolgirls (2020)
Schramm (1993)
Schtonk! (1992)
Schuks! Your Country Needs You (2013)
Schuks Tshabalala's Survival Guide to South Africa (2010)
Schulmädchen-Report (1970)
Schultze Gets the Blues (2003)
Schwarz und weiß wie Tage und Nächte (1978)
Schweik in Civilian Life (1927)
Schweik's New Adventures (1943)
Schweitzer (1990)

Sci-Scy

Sci-Fighters (1996)
Science Fair (2018)
Science Moms (2017)
Science Ninja Team Gatchaman: The Movie (1978)
The Science of Sleep (2006)
The Scientific Cardplayer (1973)
Scirocco (1987)
Scissors (1991)
Scobie Malone (1975)
The Scoffer (1920)
Scooby-Doo series:
Scoob! (2020)
Scooby-Doo (2002)
Scooby-Doo! Abracadabra-Doo (2010)
Scooby-Doo! Adventures: The Mystery Map  (2013)
Scooby-Doo and the Alien Invaders (2000)
Scooby-Doo! in Arabian Nights (1994) (TV)
Scooby-Doo! & Batman: The Brave and the Bold (2018)
Scooby-Doo! Camp Scare (2010)
Scooby-Doo! Curse of the Lake Monster (2010 TV)
Scooby-Doo and the Cyber Chase (2001)
Scooby-Doo! Frankencreepy (2014)
Scooby-Doo! and the Goblin King (2008)
Scooby-Doo! and Kiss: Rock and Roll Mystery (2015)
Scooby-Doo! Legend of the Phantosaur (2011)
Scooby-Doo! and the Legend of the Vampire (2003)
Scooby-Doo! and the Loch Ness Monster (2004)
Scooby-Doo! Mask of the Blue Falcon (2013)
Scooby-Doo Meets the Boo Brothers (1987 TV)
Scooby-Doo! and the Monster of Mexico (2003)
Scooby-Doo! Moon Monster Madness (2015)
Scooby-Doo! Music of the Vampire (2012)
Scooby-Doo! The Mystery Begins (2009 TV)
Scooby-Doo! Pirates Ahoy! (2006)
Scooby-Doo! and the Reluctant Werewolf (1988 TV)
Scooby-Doo! Shaggy's Showdown (2017)
Scooby-Doo! Stage Fright (2013)
Scooby-Doo! in Where's My Mummy? (2005)
Scooby-Doo! and the Witch's Ghost (1999)
Scooby-Doo! WrestleMania Mystery (2014)
Scooby-Doo! and WWE: Curse of the Speed Demon (2016)
Scooby-Doo on Zombie Island (1998)
Scooby-Doo 2: Monsters Unleashed (2004)
Scoop: (1987 & 2006)
Scoop! (2016)
The Scoop (1934)
Scorched: (2003 & 2008 TV)
Scorched Earth: (1969 & 2018)
Scorcher (2002)
Scorchers (1991)
Scorching Fury (1952)
Scorching Sands (1923)
Scorching Sun, Fierce Winds, Wild Fire (1978)
Score: (1974 & 2016)
The Score: (1978, 2001 & 2021)
Score: A Hockey Musical (2010)
Scorned (2013)
The Scorned (2005 TV)
Scorned and Swindled (1984 TV)
Scorpio (1973)
Scorpio Nights (1985)
Scorpio Rising (1964)
Scorpion: (2007 & 2018)
The Scorpion King (1992)
The Scorpion King series:
The Scorpion King (2002)
The Scorpion King 4: Quest for Power (2015)
The Scorpion King 3: Battle for Redemption (2012)
The Scorpion King 2: Rise of a Warrior (2008)
Scorpion in Love (2013)
The Scorpion with Two Tails (1982)
Scorpion's Revenge (1997)
Scotched in Scotland (1954)
Scotland, PA (2001)
Scotland Yard: (1930 & 1941)
Scotland Yard Hunts Dr. Mabuse (1963)
Scotland Yard Investigator (1945)
The Scotland Yard Mystery (1934)
Scotland Yet (2014)
Scott of the Antarctic (1948)
Scott Pilgrim vs. the World (2010)
Scott Walker: 30 Century Man (2006)
Scottsboro: An American Tragedy (2001)
Scotty Finds a Home (1935)
Scotty and the Secret History of Hollywood (2017)
The Scoundrel: (1935, 1935, 1939 & 1988)
The Scoundrel's Wife (2002)
The Scourge (1922)
The Scourge of the Desert (1915)
The Scourge of God (1920)
The Scout (1994)
Scout toujours... (1985)
Scout's Honor (1980 TV)
The Scouting Book for Boys (2009)
Scram! (1932)
Scramble (1970)
Scrambled Aches (1957)
Scrambled Brains (1951)
Scrambled Eggs: (1939 & 1976)
Scrambled Wives (1921)
Scrap Happy Daffy (1943)
Scrap Heaven (2005)
Scrap the Japs (1942)
Scrapbook (2000)
Scrapper (2011)
The Scrapper (1917)
The Scrappin' Kid (1926)
Scratch: (2001, 2008, 2010 & 2015)
Scratch and Crow (1995)
Scratch My Back (1920)
Scratch-As-Catch-Can (1932)
Scratched (1916)
Scratches in the Table (1998)
Scrawl (2015)
Scream (1981)
Scream series:
Scream: (1996 & 2022)
Scream 2 (1997)
Scream 3 (2000)
Scream 4 (2011)
Scream VI (2023)
Scream of the Banshee (2011 TV)
Scream Blacula Scream (1973)
Scream Bloody Murder (1973)
Scream of the Demon Lover (1970)
Scream for Help (1984)
A Scream in the Night: (1919 & 1934)
Scream Park (2013)
Scream Queen Hot Tub Party (1991)
Scream and Scream Again (1970)
Scream of Stone (1991)
A Scream in the Streets (1973)
The Scream Team (2002 TV)
Scream of the Wolf (1974 TV)
Scream, Baby, Scream (1969)
Scream, Pretty Peggy (1973 TV)
Scream, Queen! My Nightmare on Elm Street (2019)
Screamers: (1995, 2006 & 2016)
Screamers: The Hunting (2009)
Screaming Eagles (1956)
Screaming Jets (1951)
Screaming Masterpiece (2005)
Screaming Mimi (1958)
The Screaming Shadow (1920)
The Screaming Skull (1958)
The Screaming Woman (1972 TV)
Screamplay (1985)
Screams of a Winter Night (1979)
Screen Souvenirs (1932)
Screen Test (1937)
Screenagers (2016)
Screening (2006)
Screw Loose (1999)
The Screwball (1943)
Screwball Hotel (1988)
Screwballs (1983)
Screwballs II (1985)
The Screwdriver (1941)
Screwed (2000)
The Screwy Truant (1945)
The Scribbler (2014)
The Scribe (1966)
The Scriptwriter (2016)
Scrooge: (1913, 1935, 1951 & 1970)
Scrooge, or, Marley's Ghost (1901)
Scrooge: A Christmas Carol (2022)
Scrooged (1988)
The Scrub Lady (1917)
Scrub Me Mama with a Boogie Beat (1941)
Scudda Hoo! Scudda Hay! (1948)
Sculpting Memory (2015)
The Sculptor (2009)
Scum: (1977 TV & 1979)
Scum of the Earth (1974)
Scum of the Earth! (1963)
Scumbag (2017)
Scummy Man (2006)
Scuola di ladri (1986)
Scuola di ladri - Parte seconda (1987)
Scusa ma ti chiamo amore (2008)
Scusa se è poco (1982)
Scusate il ritardo (1983)
Scusi lei è normale? (1979)
The Scuttlers (1920)
The Scythian (2018)

Se

Se Amar Mon Kereche (2012)
Se arrienda (2005)
Se mi vuoi bene (2019)
Se solicitan modelos (1954)
Se son rose (2018)

Sea

The Sea: (1933, 2000, 2002 & 2013)
The Sea Around Us (1953)
Sea Beast (2008 TV)
The Sea Beast: (1926 & 2022)
The Sea Chase (1955)
Sea Devils: (1931, 1937 & 1953)
Sea Dogs (1916)
Sea Dogs of Australia (1913)
Sea Fever (2019)
Sea Fighting in Greece (1897)
Sea Fog (2014)
Sea Fury: (1929 & 1958)
The Sea Ghost (1931)
The Sea God (1930)
The Sea Hawk (1940)
Sea Horses (1926)
The Sea Inside (2004)
Sea Legs (1930)
Sea of Love: (1955 & 1989)
Sea Monsters: A Prehistoric Adventure (2007)
Sea Point Days (2008)
Sea Racketeers (1937)
Sea Raiders (1941)
Sea Rex (2010)
Sea Salts (1949)
Sea Scouts (1939)
The Sea of Trees (2015)
The Sea Wolf: (1913, 1920, 1926, 1930, 1941 & 1993 TV)
The Sea Wolves (1980)
Seabiscuit (2003)
The Seafarers (1953)
Seafood (2001)
Seal Team Six: The Raid on Osama Bin Laden (2012)
Séance: (2006 & 2021)
Séance on a Wet Afternoon (1964)
Search for Beauty (1934)
Search and Destroy: (1979 & 1995)
Search Party (2014)
The Searchers (1956)
Searching (2018)
Searching for Bobby Fischer (1993)
Searching for Sugar Man (2012)
Season of Monsters (1987)
Season of the Witch: (1973 & 2011)
The Seasoning House (2012)
Seasons (2015)
Seasons of Love (1999 TV)

Seb-Sec

Sebastian: (1968, 1995 & 2017)
Sebastian and the Sparrow (1988)
Sebastian Star Bear: First Mission (1991)
Sebastiane (1976)
Seclusion Near a Forest (1976)
Second Act (2018)
Second Chance: (1947, 1950, 1953, 1976 & 1996)
A Second Chance: (2014 & 2015)
The Second Chance (2006)
Second Chorus (1940)
Second Coming (2014)
Second in Command (2006)
Second Fiddle: (1923, 1939 & 1957)
The Second Hundred Years (1927)
The Second Jungle Book: Mowgli & Baloo (1998)
Second Skin: (1999 & 2008)
Second Time Around (2001)
The Second Time Around: (1961 & 2016)
Second Time Lucky (1984)
The Second Woman: (1950, 1953 & 2012)
Secondhand Lions (2003)
Seconds: (1966 & 2014)
Seconds Apart (2011)
Secret: (2007 & 2009)
The Secret: (1955, 1974, 1990, 1992 TV, 2006, 2007 & 2016)
Secret Admirer (1985)
Secret Agent: (1936 & 1947)
The Secret of the American Docks (1919)
Secret Beyond the Door (1947)
Secret of the Blue Room (1932)
The Secret of the Blue Room (1933)
The Secret of Cavelli (1934)
Secret Ceremony (1968)
The Secret Diaries of Miss Anne Lister (2010)
The Secret Fury (1950)
The Secret Garden: (1919, 1949, 1987 TV, 1993 & 2020)
The Secret of the Grain (2007)
Secret Headquarters (2022)
Secret Honor (1984)
Secret of the Incas (1954)
The Secret of Kells (2009)
The Secret Life of Bees (2008)
The Secret Life of Pets (2016)
The Secret Life of Pets 2 (2019)
The Secret Life of Walter Mitty: (1947 & 2013)
The Secret Life of Words (2005)
The Secret Lives of Dentists (2004)
The Secret of the Magic Gourd (2007)
The Secret of My Success: (1965 & 1987)
The Secret of NIMH (1982)
The Secret of NIMH 2: Timmy to the Rescue (1997)
Secret People (1952)
The Secret of Roan Inish (1994)
The Secret of Santa Vittoria (1969)
Secret of the Sphinx (1964)
The Secret of the Submarine (1915)
Secret Sunshine (2007)
Secret Superstar (2017)
Secret in Their Eyes (2016)
The Secret in Their Eyes (2009)
Secret Things (2002)
Secret Treasure (2015)
The Secret War of Harry Frigg (1968)
Secret of the Wastelands (1941)
Secret Window (2004)
The Secret World of Arrietty (2010)
Secretariat (2010)
Secretary: (1976 & 2002)
The Secretary: (1938 & 1995 TV)
Secrets: (1924, 1933, 1968, 1971, 1992 American & 1992 Australian)
Secrets & Lies (1996)
The Secrets We Keep (2020)

Sed-See

Sedap Malam (1951)
Sedige Sedu (1970)
Sedina Hakki (1985)
Sedona (2011)
Sedotti e bidonati (1964)
Seduce Me (2013)
Seduced and Abandoned: (1964 & 2013)
Seduced and Betrayed (1995 TV)
Seduced by Madness (1996 TV)
The Seducer of Granada (1953)
The Seducers (1969)
Seducing Doctor Lewis (2003)
Seducing Maarya (2000)
Seducing Mr. Perfect (2006)
Seductio (1987)
Seduction: (1973, 1981 & 2013)
The Seduction (1982)
The Seduction of Joe Tynan (1979)
The Seduction of Mimi (1972)
Seduction: The Cruel Woman (1985)
See America Thirst (1930)
See Angkor and Die (1993)
See Anthony Run (2005)
See Arnold Run (2005 TV)
See-Bar (1980)
See China and Die (1981 TV)
See Girl Run (2012)
See Grace Fly (2003)
See Here, Private Hargrove (1944)
See How She Runs (1978 TV)
See How They Dance (2011)
See How They Fall (1994)
See How They Run: (1955, 1964 TV, 2006 & 2022)
See for Me (2021)
See No Evil: (1971 & 2006)
See No Evil, Hear No Evil (1989)
See the Sea (1997)
See Spot Run (2001)
See You in Hell, My Darling (1999)
See You in the Morning (1989)
See You Next Tuesday (2013)
See You in the Next War (1980)
See You Then (2021)
See You in Valhalla (2015)
Seed: (1931 & 2007)
The Seed: (2006 & 2021)
Seed of Chucky (2004)
Seeds of Yesterday (2015)
Seeing Allred (2018)
Seeing Other People (2004)
The Seeker: The Dark Is Rising (2007)
The Seekers: (1954 & 1979 TV)
Seeking a Friend for the End of the World (2012)
Seeking Justice (2011)
Seema: (1955 & 1971)
Seems Like Old Times (1980)

Seh-Sem

Sehra (1963)
Sehnsucht (1920)
Sei (2018)
Sei Chokh (1976)
Sei Lá (2014)
Seiji: Riku no Sakana (2012)
Seiryū no dōkutsu (1956)
Seize the Day (1986)
Seized (2020)
Seizure (1974)
Sekal Has to Die (1998)
Sekigahara (2017)
Seksmisja (1984)
Selah and the Spades (2019)
Selam (2013)
Selamat Berdjuang, Masku! (1951)
Selamuthu Pinna (2004)
Selänne (2013)
Selbe: One Among Many (1983)
Selena (1997)
Self Control (1938)
Self Defense: (1932 & 1983)
Self Helpless (2010)
Self Made (2014)
Self Made Lady (1932)
Self Medicated (2005)
A Self Made Hero (1996)
The Self Seeker (1929)
The Self-Destruction of Gia (2003)
A Self-Made Failure (1924)
Self-Made Maids (1950)
A Self-Made Widow (1917)
The Self-Made Wife (1923)
Self-Portrait (1969)
Self/less (2015)
Selfie: (2014, 2018 & 2019)
Selfie from Hell (2018)
Selfie King (2020)
Selfie Raja (2016)
The Selfish Giant: (1972 & 2013)
Selkie (2000)
Sell Out! (2008)
Sella Turcica (2010)
Sellam Nethnam Lellam (2017)
Selling Innocence (2005 TV)
Selling Out (1972)
Selma (2014)
Selvaggi (1995)
Selvam: (1966, 2005 & 2011)
Semana santa (2002)
Semana Santa (2015)
Semana santa en Acapulco (1981)
Semillas que el mar arrastra (2008)
Seminole (1953)
Semi-Pro (2008)
Semi-Tough (1977)
Semma (2018)
Semma Botha Aagathey (2018)
Semne în pustiu (1996)
Semper Fi (2019)
Semper Fi: Always Faithful (2011)
Semyon Dezhnev (1983)

Sen-Sey

Sen Yan's Devotion (1924)
Sena (2003)
Sena/Quina, la inmortalidad del cangrejo (2005)
Senathipathi (1996)
Send Me No Flowers (1964)
The Sender (1982)
Sengoku Jieitai 1549 (2005)
Senior Moment (2021)
Senior Year: (2010 & 2022)
Senna (2010)
Sensation (1936)
The Sensation of Sight (2006)
Sensations (1975)
Sensations of 1945 (1944)
Sense and Sensibility (1995)
Senseless (1998)
Senso (1954)
The Sentimental Bloke: (1918, 1932 & 1963 TV)
The Sentinel: (1977 & 2006)
Sen'un Ajia no Joō (1957)
Seo Bok (2021)
Seopyeonje (1993)
Seoul Train (2005)
Separate Lies (2005)
Separate Tables (1958)
Separation: (1967, 2013 & 2021)
A Separation (2011)
September: (1984, 1987, 2003 & 2011)
September 12th (2005)
September 30, 1955 (1977)
September Affair (1950)
September Dawn (2007)
The September Issue (2009)
September Nights (1957)
September in the Rain (1937)
September Storm (1960)
Sequel to the Diamond from the Sky (1916)
Seraphim Falls (2007)
A Serbian Film (2010)
Serenade (1956)
Serendipity (2001)
Serena (2014)
Serene Velocity (1970)
Serenity: (2005 & 2019)
Sergeant Rutledge (1960)
Sergeant Ryker (1968)
Sergeant York (1941)
Serial (1980)
Serial Lover (1998)
Serial Mom (1994)
Série noire (1979)
Series 7: The Contenders (2001)
Serious Charge (1959)
A Serious Man (2009)
Serious Moonlight: (1983 & 2009)
Serpent of the Nile (1953)
The Serpent and the Rainbow (1988)
The Serpent's Egg (1977)
The Serpent's Kiss (1997)
Serpentinen Tanz (1895)
Serpico (1973)
The Servant: (1963, 1989 & 2010)
Servants' Entrance (1934)
Serve the People (2022)
Service de nuit (1943)
Serving Sara (2002)
Sesame Street Presents: Follow That Bird (1985)
Session 9 (2001)
The Sessions (2012)
Set It Off (1996)
Set It Up (2018)
The Set-Up: (1926, 1949 & 1995)
Setoutsumi (2016)
Settai (2013)
Sette scialli di seta gialla (1972)
Setup (2011)
Seven: (1979, 1995, 2019 Indian & 2019 Nigerian)
Seven Beauties (1975)
Seven Blood-Stained Orchids (1972)
Seven Blows of The Dragon (1972)
Seven Brides for Seven Brothers (1954)
Seven Chances (1925)
Seven Days in May (1964)
Seven Days to Noon (1950)
Seven Days in Utopia (2011)
Seven Days... Seven Nights (1960)
The Seven Deadly Sins: (1952 & 1962)
Seven Deaths in the Cat's Eye (1973)
Seven Hills of Rome (1957)
Seven Keys to Baldpate: (1916, 1917, 1925, 1929, 1935 & 1947)
Seven Minutes in Heaven (1985)
The Seven Pearls (1917)
The Seven-Per-Cent Solution (1977)
Seven Psychopaths (2012)
Seven Pounds (2008)
The Seven Red Berets (1969)
Seven Samurai (1954)
Seven Sweethearts (1942)
Seven Swords (2005)
The Seven Tapes (2012)
The Seven from Texas (1964)
Seven Times Seven (1969)
Seven Up! (1964)
Seven Wonders of the World (1956)
The Seven Year Itch (1955)
Seven Years in Tibet: (1956 & 1997)
The Seven-Ups (1973)
Seventeen Again (2000)
Seventeen Moments of Spring (1973)
Seventeen Years (1999)
The Seventh Bullet (1972)
The Seventh Continent: (1966 & 1989)
The Seventh Cross (1944)
The Seventh Curse (1986)
Seventh Heaven: (1927, 1937 & 1993)
Seventh Moon (2008)
The Seventh Seal (1957)
The Seventh Sign (1988)
The Seventh Sin (1957)
Seventh Son (2014)
The Seventh Son (1926)
The Seventh Sword (1962)
The Seventh Veil (1945)
The Seventh Victim (1943)
The Seventh Victim (1964)
Sever (2018)
A Severa (1931)
Severance (2006)
(Sex) Appeal (2014)
Sex in Chains (1928)
Sex and the City (2008)
Sex and the City 2 (2010)
Sex and Death 101 (2007)
Sex Drive (2008)
Sex & Fury (1973)
Sex Lives of the Potato Men (2004)
Sex and Lucia (2001)
Sex Madness (1938)
The Sex Monster (1999)
Sex Pot: (1975 & 2009)
Sex and the Single Girl (1964)
The Sex of the Stars (1993)
Sex Tape (2014)
Sex of the Witch (1973)
Sex World (1977)
Sex and Zen (1992)
Sex Is Zero (2002)
Sex Is Zero 2 (2007)
sex, lies, and videotape (1989)
Sex: The Annabel Chong Story (1999)
Sexmission (1984)
Sexo, pudor y lágrimas (1999)
Sextette (1978)
Sextuplets (2019)
Sexual Meditation: Room with View (1971)
Sexy Beast (2000)
Sexy Susan Sins Again (1968)
Seymour: An Introduction (2014)

Sg

Sgt. Bilko (1996)
Sgt. Ernesto 'Boy' Ybañez: Tirtir Gang (1988)
Sgt. Kabukiman N.Y.P.D. (1991)
Sgt. Pepper's Lonely Hearts Club Band (1978)
Sgt. Stubby: An American Hero (2018)
Sgt. Will Gardner (2019)

Sh

Sha

The Shack (2017)
Shaadi Se Pehle (2006)
Shade (2003)
The Shade (1999)
Shades of Fern (1986)
Shades of the Heart (2019)
Shadow: (1956, 1971, 2009 Hindi, 2009 Italian, 2013 & 2018)
The Shadow: (1920, 1933, 1937, 1954, 1994 & unreleased)
Shadow Builder (1998)
Shadow in the Cloud (2020)
Shadow Conspiracy (1997)
Shadow of a Doubt (1943)
Shadow Magic (2000)
Shadow Man: (1988 & 2006)
Shadow of the Thin Man (1941)
Shadow of the Vampire (2000)
Shadowboxer (2006)
Shadowlands: (1985 TV & 1993)
Shadowless Sword (2005)
Shadows: (1916, 1919, 1922, 1931, 1953, 1959, 2007 & 2020)
Shadows and Fog (1992)
Shadows of Forgotten Ancestors (1965)
Shadows of a Great City (1913)
Shadows of a Hot Summer (1978)
Shadows and Lies (2010)
Shadows in Paradise: (1986 & 2010)
Shadows in the Sun (2001)
Shaft series:
Shaft: (1971, 2000 & 2019)
Shaft in Africa (1973)
Shaft's Big Score (1972)
Shag (1989)
The Shaggy D.A. (1976)
The Shaggy Dog: (1959 & 2006)
Shake Hands With the Devil: (1959 & 2007)
Shake Hands with the Devil: The Journey of Roméo Dallaire (2004)
Shake! Otis at Monterey (1987)
Shakedown: (1936, 1950, 1988 & 2018)
The Shakedown: (1929 & 1959)
Shakedown: Return of the Sontarans (1995)
Shakes the Clown (1991)
Shakespeare in Love (1998)
Shakespeare Wallah (1965)
The Shakiest Gun in the West (1968)
Shalako (1968)
Shall We Dance: (1937, 1996 & 2004)
Shallow Grave (1994)
Shallow Ground (2005)
Shallow Hal (2001)
The Shallows (2016)
Shame: (1921, 1922, 1968 & 2011)
Shampoo (1975)
Shamrock Hill (1949)
Shane (1953)
Shang-Chi and the Legend of the Ten Rings (2021)
Shanghai Dreams (2005)
Shanghai Express (1932)
The Shanghai Gesture (1941)
Shanghai Kiss (2007)
Shanghai Knights (2003)
Shanghai Noon (2000)
Shanghai Story (2004)
Shanghai Surprise (1986)
Shanghai Triad (1995)
Shaolin (2011)
The Shaolin Drunken Monk (1981)
Shaolin Soccer (2001)
Shaolin Temple: (1976 & 1982)
Shaolin Wooden Men (1976)
Shaolin and Wu Tang (1981)
Shape of the Moon (2004)
The Shape of Things (2003)
The Shape of Water (2017)
Shararat: (1944, 1959, 2002 & 2003)
Shark: (2000 & 2021)
Shark! (1969)
The Shark: (1920 & 1930)
Shark: Mind of a Demon (2006)
Shark Attack trilogy:
Shark Attack (1999)
Shark Attack 2 (2000)
Shark Attack 3: Megalodon (2004)
Shark Night (2011)
Shark Skin Man and Peach Hip Girl (1999)
Shark Tale (2004)
Sharknado series:
Sharknado (2013)
Sharknado 2: The Second One (2014)
Sharknado 3: Oh Hell No! (2015)
Sharknado: The 4th Awakens (2016)
Sharknado 5: Global Swarming (2017)
The Last Sharknado: It's About Time (2018)
Sharks' Treasure (1975)
Sharkwater (2006)
Sharky's Machine (1981)
Sharp Stick (2022)
Shaso (1989)
Shatter Dead (1994)
Shattered: (1921, 1972, 1991, 2007, 2011 & 2022)
Shattered Glass (2003)
Shaukeen (1981)
Shaun of the Dead (2004)
Shaun the Sheep Movie (2015)
The Shawshank Redemption (1994)
Shazam! (2019)
Shazam! Fury of the Gods (2023)

She

She: (1911, 1916, 1917, 1925, 1935, 1954, 1965 & 1984)
The She Beast (1966)
She Couldn't Say No: (1930, 1939, 1940 & 1954)
She Creature (2001)
She-Devil (1989)
She Dies Tomorrow (2020)
She Done Him Wrong (1933)
She Gods of Shark Reef (1958)
She Grazed Horses on Concrete (1982)
She Hate Me (2004)
She Never Died (2019)
She Remembers, He Forgets (2015)
She Said (2022)
She Shoulda Said No! (1949)
She Stoops to Conquer (1914)
She Was an Acrobat's Daughter (1937)
She Wore a Yellow Ribbon (1949)
She's All That (1999)
She's Gotta Have It (1986)
She's Having a Baby (1988)
She's the Man (2006)
She's the One (1996)
She's Out of Control (1989)
She's Out of My League (2010)
She's a Sheik (1927)
She's So Lovely (1997)
She's Too Young (2004) 
She-Devil (1989)
She-Wolf of London (1946)
Sheena (1984)
The Sheep (1920)
The Sheep Thief (1997)
Sheep Without a Shepherd (2019)
The Sheepman (1958)
The Sheik (1921)
Sheitan (2006)
Shelby American (2019)
 Shell and Joint (2019)
Shelter: (2007 & 2010)
Shelter Dogs (2003)
The Sheltering Sky (1990)
Shenandoah (1965)
Shepherd (2021)
The Shepherd of the Hills: (1919, 1928, 1941 & 1964)
The Shepherd: Border Patrol (2008)
The Sheriff of Fractured Jaw (1958)
The Sheriff of Hope Eternal (1921)
Sherlock Gnomes (2018)
Sherlock Holmes: (1916, 1922, 1932, 2009 & 2010)
Sherlock Holmes Baffled (1900)
Sherlock Holmes Faces Death (1943)
Sherlock Holmes in the Great Murder Mystery (1908)
Sherlock Holmes and the Secret Weapon (1943)
Sherlock Holmes and the Voice of Terror (1942)
Sherlock Holmes in Washington (1943)
Sherlock Holmes: A Game of Shadows (2011)
Sherlock Jr. (1924)
Sherman's March: A Meditation on the Possibility of Romantic Love In the South During an Era of Nuclear Weapons Proliferation (1986)
Sherman's Way (2009)
Sherrybaby (2006)

Shi

Shi Er Sheng Xiao Cheng Shi Ying Xiong (2014)
The Shielding Shadow (1916)
Shikake-nin Baian (1981)
Shiki-Jitsu (2000)
Shimajirō to Fufu no Daibōken: Sukue! Nanairo no Hana (2013)
Shimajiro to Kujira no Uta (2014)
Shimajirō to Ōkina Ki (2015)
Shimmer Lake (2017)
Shine (1996)
Shine a Light (2008)
The Shining (1980)
The Shining Hour (1938)
Shining Through (1992)
Shining Victory (1941)
Shinjuku Incident (2009)
Shinjuku Triad Society (1995)
Shinobi: Heart Under Blade (2005)
Shinsukki Blues (2004)
Ship Ahoy (1942)
A Ship Bound for India (1947)
A Ship Comes In (1928)
Ship of Fools (1965)
The Ship from Shanghai (1930)
Ship of Theseus (2012)
The Shipment (2001)
The Shipping News (2001)
The Shiralee (1957)
Shiri (1999)
Shirley: (1922 & 2020)
Shirley Valentine (1989)
Shiroi Kyotō (1966)
Shithouse (2020)
Shiver: (2003 & 2012)
Shivering Shakespeare (1930)
Shivers: (1975 & 1981)
Shiza (2004)

Sho

Shoah (1985)
Shock: (1946, 1977, 2004 & 2006)
The Shock (1923)
Shock Corridor (1963)
A Shock to the System (1990)
Shock Treatment (1981)
Shock Waves (1977)
Shocker (1989)
Shocking Asia (1974)
Shocking Asia II: The Last Taboos (1985)
Shoemaker (1996)
The Shoemaker and the Doll (1913)
The Shoemaker and the Elves (1935)
Shoes: (1916 & 2012)
The Shoes of the Fisherman (1968)
Shoeshine (1946)
Shogun Assassin (1980)
Shogun and Little Kitchen (1992)
Shogun's Samurai (1978)
Shogun's Shadow (1989)
Shokubutsu Zukan: Unmei no Koi, Hiroimashita (2016)
Sholay (1975)
Shoot 'Em Up (2007)
Shoot First, Die Later (1974)
Shoot to Kill: (1947, 1960, 1988 & 1990 TV)
Shoot the Moon (1982)
Shoot the Piano Player (1960)
Shooter: (1988 TV, 2007, 2016 & 2022)
The Shooting (1968)
Shooting Dogs (2005)
Shooting Fish (1997)
Shooting the Mafia (2019)
Shooting at the Moon (2003)
The Shootist (1976)
Shootout at Wadala (2013)
The Shop Around the Corner (1940)
The Shop on Main Street (1965)
Shopgirl (2001)
Shoplifters (2018)
Shoplifters of the World (2021)
Shopping: (1994 & 2013)
Shor in the City (2011)
Short Circuit: (1943, 1986 & 2019)
Short Circuit 2 (1988)
Short Cuts (1993)
A Short Film About Killing (1988)
A Short Film About Love (1988)
Short Term 12 (2013)
Shortbus (2006)
Shorts: (2009 & 2013)
Shot Caller (2017)
Show Boat: (1929, 1936 & 1951)
Show Girl (1928)
Show Me Love (1998)
Show Me the Ghost (2021)
Showdown: (1942, 1963, 1973 & 1993)
The Showdown: (1928, 1940, 1950 & 2011)
Showdown at Abilene (1956)
Showdown at Boot Hill (1958)
Showdown at the Cotton Mill (1978)
Showdown in Little Tokyo (1991)
Showgirl in Hollywood (1930)
Showgirls (1995)
Showing Up (2022)
The Showman (1930)
Showtime (2002)

Shr-Shy

Shraap 3D (TBD)
Shravana Banthu (1984)
Shravani Subramanya (2013)
Shredder (2003)
Shredder Orpheus (1990)
Shredderman Rules (2007 TV)
Shree: (2002 & 2013)
Shree 420 (1955)
Shrek series:
Shrek (2001)
Shrek 2 (2004)
Shrek the Third (2007)
Shrek Forever After (2010)
Shri Chaitanya Mahaprabhu (1954)
Shri Ganesh Mahima (1950)
Shri Hanuman Chalisa (2013)
Shri Krishna Janma (1918)
Shri Krishna Leela (1971)
Shri Rama Bantu (1979)
Shri Ramanuja (1943)
Shri Shaila Mahathme (1961)
Shriek If You Know What I Did Last Friday the 13th (2000)
Shriek of the Mutilated (1974)
Shrieker (1997)
Shriman Prithviraj (1973)
Shriman Satyawadi (1960)
Shriman Shrimati (1982)
Shrimanthana Magalu (1977)
Shrimathi (2011)
Shrimp (2018)
Shrimps for a Day (1934)
Shrink (2009)
Shrirasthu Shubhamasthu (2000)
Shriver (TBD)
Shrooms (2007)
Shu Thayu? (2018)
Shudra: The Rising (2012)
Shukriya: Till Death Do Us Apart (2004)
Shunkinshō (1976)
Shuruaat Ka Interval (2014)
Shut In: (2016 & 2022)
Shut My Big Mouth (1942)
Shut Up and Kiss Me (2004)
Shut Up and Play the Hits (2012)
Shut Up and Shoot! (2006)
Shut Up and Shoot Me (2005)
Shut Up & Sing (2006)
Shutter: (2004, 2008, 2012 & 2014)
Shutter Island (2010)
Shuttle (2009)
Shuttlecock (1991)
Shuttlecock Boys (2011)
Shyam (2016)
A Shyam Gopal Varma Film (2015)
Shyama (1986)
Shyamala (1952)
Shyamala Chechi (1965)
Shyamchi Aai (1953)
Shyamol Chhaya (2005)
Shylock: (1940 & 2020)
Shyloo (2011)
Shyness Machine Girl (2009)

Si

Si accettano miracoli (2015)
Siberiade (1979)
Siberian Lady Macbeth (1961)
Sicario: (1994 & 2015)
Sicario: Day of the Soldado (2018)
The Sicilian Clan (1969)
The Sicilian Connection (1972)
Sick of Myself (2022)
Sick: The Life and Death of Bob Flanagan, Supermasochist (1997)
Sicko (2007)
Sid and Nancy (1986)
Side Effects (2013)
Side Out (1990)
Side by Side: (1975 & 2012)
Side Street: (1929 & 1950)
Side Street Story (1950)
Side Streets: (1933, 1934 & 1998)
Sidewalks of New York: (1923, 1931 & 2001)
Sideways (2004)
Sidney (2022)
Siege: (1925 & 1940)
The Siege: (1956 & 1998)
Siegfried (1924)
Sigade revolutsioon (2004)
Sightless (2020)
Sightseers (2012)
The Sign of the Cross: (1914 & 1932)
The Signal: (2007 & 2014)
The Signalman (1976) (TV)
Signature Move (2017)
Le Signe du Lion (1962)
Signore & Signori (1965)
Signs (2002)
Siin me oleme! (1979)
Sikandar: (1941 & 2009)
Silence: (1926, 1931, 1963, 1971, 2010, 2013 & 2016)
The Silence: (1963, 1998, 2006 TV, 2010, 2015 & 2019)
Silence and Cry (1968)
Silence of the Heart (1984) (TV)
The Silence of the Lambs (1991)
The Silence of the Marsh (2019)
Silence of the North (1981)
The Silencers (1966)
The Silencing (2020)
Silent Action (1975)
The Silent Enemy: (1930 & 1958)
Silent Hill (2006)
Silent Hill: Revelation 3D (2012)
The Silent Historian (2011)
Silent House (2011)
The Silent House: (1929 & 2010)
Silent Light (2007)
Silent Madness (1984)
Silent Movie (1976)
Silent Night: (1995, 2002 TV, 2012 & 2021)
Silent Night, Bloody Night (1974)
Silent Night, Deadly Night series:
Silent Night, Deadly Night (1984)
Silent Night, Deadly Night Part 2 (1987)
Silent Night, Deadly Night 3: Better Watch Out! (1989)
Silent Night, Deadly Night 4: Initiation (1990)
Silent Night, Deadly Night 5: The Toy Maker (1991)
SIlent Panic (2019)
The Silent Partner: (1917, 1923, 1931, 1939 & 1978)
Silent Rage (1982)
Silent Running (1971)
Silent Tongue (1994)
Silent Warnings (2003) (TV)
Silent Witness (2013)
The Silent World (1956)
Silk: (2006 & 2007)
Silk Road (2021)
The Silk Road (1988)
Silk Stockings: (1927 & 1957)
Silkwood (1983)
Silmido (2003)
Silu (1987)
Silver & Black (2019)
Silver Bullet (1985)
The Silver Chalice (1954)
Silver City: (1951, 1984 & 2004)
Silver Dollar (1932)
The Silver Lining: (1915, 1919, 1921, 1927 & 1932)
Silver Linings Playbook (2012)
Silver Lode (1954)
Silver Streak: (1934 & 1976)
Silverado (1985)
The Simian Line (2000)
The Similars (2015)
Simon Birch (1998)
Simon of the Desert (1965)
Simon Killer (2012)
Simon Says (2006)
Simon Sez (1999)
Simon, Simon (1970)
Simone: (1918, 1926 & 2002)
Simpatico (2000)
A Simple Death (1985)
A Simple Favor (2018)
A Simple Noodle Story (2009)
Simple Passion (2020)
A Simple Plan (1998)
The Simple Things (1953)
A Simple Twist of Fate (1994)
A Simple Wish (1997)
Simply Irresistible (1999)
The Simpsons Movie (2007)
Sin: (1915, 1971, 2003 & 2019)
The Sin: (1965 & 2005)
Sin City series:
Sin City (2005)
Sin City: A Dame to Kill For (2014)
The Sin Eater (2001)
The Sin of Madelon Claudet (1931)
Sin Nombre (2009)
Sin Takes a Holiday (1930)
Sinbad (1993)
Sinbad and the Eye of the Tiger (1977)
Sinbad and The Minotaur (2011) 
Sinbad the Sailor: (1935 & 1947)
Sinbad of the Seven Seas (1989)
Sinbad: A Flying Princess and a Secret Island (2015)
Sinbad: Beyond the Veil of Mists (2000)
Sinbad: Legend of the Seven Seas (2003)
Since Otar Left (2003)
Since You Went Away (1944)
Since You've Been Gone (1998) (TV)
The Sinful Border (1951)
The Sinful Dwarf (1973)
The Sinful Nuns of Saint Valentine (1974)
The Sinful Village: (1940, 1954 & 1966)
The Sinful Woman (1916)
Sing: (1989, 2016 American & 2016 Hungarian)
Sing 2 (2021)
Sing As We Go (1934)
Sing Boy Sing (1958)
Singapore: (1947 & 1960)
Singapore Dreaming (2006)
Singapore Sling (1990)
Singin' in the Rain (1952)
The Singing Detective (2003)
The Singing Fool (1928)
The Singing Revolution (2006)
The Singing Ringing Tree (1957)
A Single Man (2009)
The Single Moms Club (2014)
Single Room Furnished (1968)
A Single Shot (2013)
The Single Sin (1931)
The Single Standard (1929)
Single White Female (1992)
Singles: (1992 & 2003)
The Singles Ward (2002)
Sinister (2012)
Sinister 2 (2015)
Sink the Bismarck! (1960)
Sink or Swim: (1990 & 2018)
Sinkin' in the Bathtub (1930)
The Sinking of the Lusitania (1918)
The Sinking of Sozopol (2014)
Sinner (2007)
The Sinner: (1928, 1940 & 1951)
Sinners in Paradise (1938)
Sinners and Saints (2010)
Sinners in the Sun (1932)
Sinners' Holiday (1930)
The Sino-Dutch War 1661 (2000)
Sins (2005)
Sins of the Mother (2010)
Sins of Our Youth (2014)
Sint (2010)
Sione's Wedding (2006)
A Sip of Love (1984)
The Siren: (1917 & 1927)
SiREN (2016)
Siren of the Tropics (1927)
Sirens: (1994 & 1999)
Sirocco (1951)
Sisi & I (2023)
Sisily 2km (2004)
Sissi (1955)
Sista Kontraktet (1998)
Sister: (2012, 2018 & Sister)
Sister Act (1992)
Sister Act 2: Back in the Habit (1993)
Sister Cupid (1987)
Sister Death (2023)
Sister Kenny (1946)
Sister Wife (2000)
Sister, Sister: (1982 TV & 1987)
The Sisterhood of the Traveling Pants (2005)
The Sisterhood of the Traveling Pants 2 (2008)
Sisters: (1922, 1930, 1973, 2001, 2006 & 2015)
The Sisters Brothers (2018)
Sisters, or the Balance of Happiness (1979)
Sitcom (1998)
Sith Apprentice (2005)
The Sitter (2011)
Sitting Bull (1954)
Sitting Pretty (1948)
Sitting Target (1972)
Six Days Seven Nights (1998)
Six Degrees of Separation (1993)
Six: The Mark Unleashed]] (2004)
Six Minutes to Midnight (2020)
Six Shooter (2004)
Six by Sondheim (2013) (TV)
Six Ways To Sunday (1997)
Six-String Samurai (1998)
Sixteen: (1943, 2013 British & 2013 Indian)
Sixteen Candles (1984)
Sixteen Tongues (2003)
The Sixth (1981)
The Sixth Man (1997)
The Sixth Sense (1999)

Sk–Sm

Skeleton Coast (1987)
The Skeleton Dance (1929)
The Skeleton Key (2005)
The Skeleton Twins (2014)
Skeletons (2010)
Ski Party (1965)
Ski Patrol: (1940 & 1990)
Ski School (1991)
Skidoo (1968)
Skin: (1995, 2008, 2018 feature, 2018 short, 2019 & 2020)
The Skin (1981)
Skin Deep: (1922, 1929, 1989 & 1995)
Skin Game (1971)
The Skin Game: (1921 & 1931)
The Skin I Live In (2012)
The Skin of Our Teeth (1959) (TV)
The Skin of the Wolf (2017)
Skin: The Movie (2020)
Skinned Deep (2004)
Skinner (1993)
Skins: (2002 & 2017)
Skinwalker (2021)
Skinwalker Ranch (2013)
Skinwalkers: (2002 & 2006)
Skipped Parts (2001)
Skippy (1931)
The Skull (1965)
Skull Heads (2009)
Skull: The Mask (2020)
 Skullduggery: (1970 & 1983)
The Skulls (2000)
The Skulls II (2002)
The Skulls III (2004)
Skum Rocks! (2013)
Sky Captain and the World of Tomorrow (2004)
Sky on Fire (2016)
Sky High: (1922, 2003 & 2005)
Sky Lovers (2002)
Sky Riders (1976)
The Sky's the Limit: (1938, 1943 & 1975 TV)
The Skydivers (1963)
Skyfall (2012)
Skyjacked (1972)
Skyline: (1931 & 2010)
Skyman (2019)
Skyscraper: (1928, 1996, 2011 & 2018)
Skytturnar (1987)
Slacker (1991)
Slackers (2002)
Slam: (1998 & 2018)
Slam Dunk Ernest (1995)
Slap Her... She's French (2002)
Slap Shot (1977)
Slapstick of Another Kind (1984)
Slasher (2004 & 2007)
Slaughter Disc (2005)
Slaughter High (1986)
The Slaughter Rule (2002)
Slaughterhouse-Five (1972)
Slaughterhouse Rulez (2018)
Slaves of New York (1989)
Slaxx (2020)
SLC Punk! (1998)
Sleep: (1964 & 2013)
Sleep with Me (1994)
Sleepaway Camp series:
Sleepaway Camp (1983)
Sleepaway Camp II: Unhappy Campers (1988)
Sleepaway Camp III: Teenage Wasteland (1989)
Sleepaway Camp IV: The Survivor (2012)
Sleeper: (1973 & 2005)
The Sleeper: (2000 TV & 2012)
Sleepers (1996)
Sleeping Beauties (1999)
Sleeping Beauty: (1942, 1949, 1955, 1959, 1973, 1987 & 2011)
The Sleeping Beauty (1930)
Sleeping Bride (2000)
The Sleeping Car Murders (1965)
The Sleeping City (1950)
The Sleeping Dictionary (2003)
Sleeping Dogs: (1977 & 1997)
Sleeping Dogs Lie: (2005 & 2006)
Sleeping with the Enemy (1991)
Sleeping Giant (2015)
Sleeping with Other People (2015)
The Sleeping Princess in Devil's Castle (1987)
Sleepless: (1957, 2001 & 2017)
Sleepless Night: (1960, 2010 & 2011)
Sleepless Nights: (1933 & 2003)
Sleepless Nights (2016)
Sleepless in Seattle (1993)
Sleepover (2004)
Sleepstalker (1995)
Sleepwalk (1986)
Sleepwalk with Me (2012)
Sleepwalkers (1992)
Sleepwalking (2008)
Sleepy Hollow (1999)
Slender Man (2015)
Sleuth: (1972 & 2007)
Sliding Doors (1998)
A Slight Case of Murder (1938)
Slightly Scarlet (1956)
Slim (1937)
Sling Blade (1996)
 Slink (2013)
The Slipper and the Rose (1976)
Slipping Wives (1927)
A Slipping-Down Life (1999)
Slipstream: (1967, 1973, 1989, 2005 & 2007)
Slither: (1973 & 2006)
Sliver (1993)
Sloane (1984)
Slovenian Girl (2009)
Slow Burn: (1986, 2000 & 2005)
The Slow Business of Going (2000)
Slow Dancing in the Big City (1978)
Slow West (2015)
The Slugger's Wife (1985)
Slugs: The Movie (1988)
Slugterra: Return of the Elementals (2014)
Slumber Party Massacre series:
The Slumber Party Massacre (1982)
Slumber Party Massacre II (1987)
Slumber Party Massacre III (1990)
Slumber Party Massacre (2021)
Slumberland (2022)
Slumdog Millionaire (2008)
Slums of Beverly Hills (1998)
The Small Back Room (1949)
Small Change (1976)
A Small Domain (1996)
Small Engine Repair (2021)
Small Faces (1996)
The Small One (1978)
Small Sacrifices (1989) (TV)
Small Soldiers (1998)
Small Time (1996)
Small Time Crooks (2000)
Small Town Crime (2017)
Small Town Rivals (2007)
The Smallest Show on Earth (1957)
Smart Alec: (1951 American & 1951 British)
Smart House (1999 TV)
Smart Money: (1931 & 1986)
Smart People (2008)
Smash Palace (1981)
Smash-Up, the Story of a Woman (1947)
Smashed (2012)
Smile: (1975, 2005 & 2022)
Smile Before Death (1972)
Smiles of a Summer Night (1955)
Smiley: (1956 & 2012)
Smiley Face (2007)
Smilin' Through (1932)
The Smiling Lieutenant (1931)
Smilla's Sense of Snow (1997)
Smithereens (1982)
Smithy: (1924, 1933 & 1946)
Smoke (1995)
Smoke on the Potato Fields (1977)
Smoke Signals (1998)
The Smokers (2000)
Smokey and the Bandit series:
Smokey and the Bandit (1977)
Smokey and the Bandit II (1980)
Smokey and the Bandit Part 3 (1983)
Smokin' Aces (2007)
Smokin' Aces 2: Assassins' Ball (2010) 
Smoking/No Smoking (1993)
Smoky: (1933, 1946 & 1966)
Smooth Talk (1985)
Smosh: The Movie (2015)
Smother (2008)
Smothered (2016)
Smugglers of Death (1959)
The Smurfs series:
The Smurfs and the Magic Flute (1976)
The Smurfs (2011)
The Smurfs: A Christmas Carol (2011)
The Smurfs 2 (2013)
The Smurfs: The Legend of Smurfy Hollow (2013)
Smurfs: The Lost Village (2017)

Sn

The Snail and the Whale (2019) (TV)
Snake & Crane Arts of Shaolin (1978)
Snake in the Eagle's Shadow (1978)
Snake Eyes: (1998 & 2021)
The Snake Girl and the Silver-Haired Witch (1968)
A Snake of June (2002)
The Snake King (2005) (TV)
The Snake King's Child (2001)
The Snake Pit (1948)
Snake's Venom (1982)
Snakeman (2005) (TV)
Snakes on a Plane (2006)
Snakes on a Train (2006)
The Snapper (1993)
Snatch (2000)
Sneakers: (1992 & 2011)
Sniper: (1931, 1993, & 2022)
The Sniper: (1952 & 2009)
Sniper 2 (2002) (TV)
Snitch (2013)
Snoop Dogg's Doggystyle (2001)
Snoop Dogg's Hood of Horror (2006)
Snoopy Come Home (1972)
The Snorkel (1958)
Snow Angels (2008)
Snow Blossom (2014)
Snow Cake (2006)
The Snow Creature (1954)
Snow Day (2000)
Snow Dogs (2002)
Snow Falling on Cedars (1999)
The Snow Queen: (1957, 1967, 1986, 1995 & 2005 TV)
The Snow Queen series:
The Snow Queen
The Snow Queen 2 (2014)
The Snow Queen 3: Fire and Ice (2016)
The Snow Queen: Mirrorlands (2018)
Snow White: (1902, 1916, 1933, 1952, 1962 & 1987)
A Snow White Christmas (1980) (TV)
Snow White and the Huntsman (2012)
The Snow White Murder Case (2014)
Snow White and the Seven Dwarfs: (1937 & 1955)
Snow White and the Three Stooges (1961)
Snow White: The Fairest of Them All (2001) (TV)
Snow White: A Tale of Terror (1997)
Snowboard Academy (1997)
Snowden (2016)
The Snowdrop Festival (1984)
The Snowman: (1982 TV & 2017)
Snowman's Land (2010)
Snowmen (2010)
Snowpiercer (2013)
The Snows of Kilimanjaro: (1952 & 2011)
Snowtime! (2015)
Snowtown (2011)
Snuff (1976)

So

So Big! (1932)
So Close (2002)
So Close to Paradise (1998)
So Cute (2003)
So Dark the Night (1946)
So Dear to My Heart (1949)
So Evil My Love (1948)
So Goes My Love (1946)
So I Married an Axe Murderer (1993)
So Long at the Fair (1950)
So Long, Stooge (1983)
So Proudly We Hail! (1943)
So Quiet on the Canine Front (1930)
So Undercover (2012)
So Young (2013)
So's Your Old Man (1926)

Soa-Som

Soak the Rich (1936)
Soaked in Bleach (2015)
Soan Papdi (2015)
Soap Bubbles (1906)
Soap Girl (2002)
Soap Life (2012)
Soap Opera: (1964 & 2014)
Soapdish (1991)
Soappu Seeppu Kannadi (1968)
Soapsuds and Sapheads (1919)
Sob o Céu da Bahia (1956)
Sob Sister (1931)
Soba (2004)
Sobar Upore Tumi (2009)
Sober Driver (2019)
Sobha (1958)
Sobi's Mystic (2017)
Sobibor (2018)
Sobibor, October 14, 1943, 4 p.m. (2001)
Sobral – O Homem que Não Tinha Preço (2013)
Soccer Killer (2017)
Soccer Mom (2008)
Soch Lo (2010)
Socha Na Tha (2005)
Social Animals: (2018 comedy & 2018 documentary)
Social Briars (1918)
Social Decay (1932)
Social Error (1935)
Social Genocide (2004)
Social Hygiene (2021)
Social Hypocrites (1918)
The Social Network (2010)
Social Register (1934)
Social Suicide (2015)
Society (1989)
Society Doctor (1935)
Society Dog Show (1939)
Society Fever (1935)
Society Girl: (1932 & 1976)
Society Lady (1978)
Society Lawyer (1939)
Society Mugs (1946)
Society Murders (2006) (TV)
Society for Sale (1918)
Society Secrets (1921)
Society Smugglers (1939)
Society Snobs (1921)
Society of the Snow (2023)
Society's Driftwood (1917)
Sock-a-Bye Baby (1942)
Sock a Doodle Do (1952)
Socket (2007)
Socko in Morocco (1954)
Socks and Cakes (2010)
Socrates (1971) 
Sodom and Gomorrah: (1922 & 1962)
Sofia's Last Ambulance (2012)
The Soft Skin (1964)
Soigne ta droite (1987)
Solace (2006)
Solarbabies (1986)
Solaris: (1972 & 2002)
Soldados de Salamina (2003)
Soldier: (1998 USA & 1998 India)
Soldier Blue (1970)
Soldier of Fortune (1955)
Soldier of Orange (1977)
Soldier in the Rain (1963)
A Soldier's Daughter Never Cries (1998)
Soldier's Girl (2003)
A Soldier's Prayer (1961)
A Soldier's Story (1984)
Soldiers of the Emperor (1918)
Sole Sisters (2003)
Sole Survivor: (1970 TV, 1984, 2000 TV & 2013)
Soleil O (1970)
The Solitaire Man (1933)
Solitary Man (2010)
Sollers Point (2017)
Solo: (1977, 1996, 2006, 2008, 2011, 2013 & 2017)
Solo: A Star Wars Story (2018)
Sólo Con Tu Pareja (1991)
The Soloist (2009)
Solomon Kane (2009)
Solomon and Sheba (1959)
Solomon's Perjury (2015)
Solos en la madrugada (1978)
Solstice (2008)
Some Came Running (1958)
Some Dudes Can Fight (1898)
Some Folks Call It a Sling Blade (1994)
Some Girls (1988)
Some Girls Do (1969)
Some Kind of Beautiful (2014)
Some Kind of Hate (2015)
Some Kind of Heaven (2020)
Some Kind of Love (2015)
Some Kind of Monster (2004)
Some Kind of Wonderful (1987)
Some Like It Hot: (1939, 1959 & 2016)
Somebody Up There Likes Me (1956)
Someone Like You (2001)
Someone Special (2004)
Someone to Watch Over Me (1987)
Somers Town (2008)
Somersault (2004)
Something in the Air: (2002 & 2012)
Something Big (1971)
Something Borrowed (2011)
Something Different: (1920 & 1963)
Something in the Dirt (2022)
Something to Hide (1972)
Something Like Happiness (2005)
Something Like a War (1991)
Something the Lord Made (2004) (TV)
Something New (2006)
Something Out of Nothing (1979)
Something to Talk About (1995)
Something Wicked (2014)
Something Wicked This Way Comes (1983)
Something Wild: (1961 & 1986)
Something's Got to Give (1996)
Something's Gotta Give (2003)
Sometimes Always Never (2018)
Sometimes Aunt Martha Does Dreadful Things (1971)
Sometimes a Great Notion (1971)
Sometimes They Come Back (1991) (TV)
Sometimes They Come Back... Again (1996)
Somewhere (2010)
Somewhere in the Night (1946)
Somewhere in Time (1980)
Somm (2012)
Somm 3 (2018)
Somm: Into the Bottle (2015)
Sommersby (1993)

Son-Soy

Son: (1955, 2008 & 2021)
The Son: (1953, 2002, 2019 Argentine, 2019 Bosnia and Herzegovina & 2022)
Son of the Bride (2001)
The Son of Captain Blood (1962)
Son of Dracula: (1943 & 1974)
Son of Flubber (1963)
Son of Frankenstein (1939)
Son of God (2014)
Son of Godzilla (1967)
Son of a Gun (2014)
Son of Kong (1933)
Son of Lassie (1945)
Son in Law (1993)
Son of Man: (1980 & 2006)
A Son of Man (2018)
Son of the Mask (2005)
Son of Monarchs (2020)
Son of Paleface (1952)
Son of the Pink Panther (1993)
Son of Rambow (2007)
Son of Samson (1960)
Son of Saul (2015)
The Son of the Sheik (1926)
Son of the White Mare (1981)
The Son's Room (2001)
The Sonata (2018)
Sonatine: (1984 & 1993)
The Song of Bernadette (1943)
A Song Is Born (1948)
Song of China (1936)
Song of the Fishermen (1934)
Song from the Forest (2013)
Song of Freedom (1936)
Song of Granite (2017)
Song of Love: (1929 & 1947)
Song at Midnight (1937)
Song of Norway (1970)
Song of Paris (1952)
Song of the Phoenix (2013)
Song for a Raggy Boy (2003)
The Song Remains the Same (1976)
Song of the Sea: (1952 & 2014)
Song of the South (1946)
Song of the Thin Man (1947)
Song of the West (1930)
Songbird: (2018 & 2020)
Songcatcher (2000)
Songs My Brothers Taught Me (2015)
Songs from the Second Floor (2000)
Songwriter (1984)
Sonic the Hedgehog (2020)
Sonic the Hedgehog 2 (2022)
Sonic the Hedgehog 3 (2024)
Sonnenallee (1999)
Sonny: (1922 & 2002)
Sonny Boy: (1929, 1989 & 2011)
Sons: (1996 & 2006)
Sons of the Clouds (2012)
Sons and Daughters in a Time of Storm (1935)
Sons of the Desert (1933)
The Sons of Great Bear (1966)
The Sons of Katie Elder (1965)
Sons of the Neon Night (TBD)
Sons of the Pioneers (1942)
Sons of Provo (2004)
Sons of Trinity (1995)
Sophie Scholl – The Final Days (2005)
Sophie's Choice (1982)
Sorcerer (1977)
The Sorcerer and the White Snake (2011)
The Sorcerer's Apprentice: (1955, 1980 & 2010)
The Sorcerers (1967)
Sorceress: (1982 & 1995)
Sordid Lives (2000)
Sorority Babes in the Slimeball Bowl-O-Rama (1988)
Sorority Boys (2002)
Sorority House Massacre (1986)
Sorority House Massacre II (1990)
Sorority House Massacre III: Hard to Die (1990)
Sorority Row (2009)
Sorrell and Son: (1927 & 1934)
The Sorrow of Mrs. Schneider (2008)
The Sorrow and the Pity (1969)
Sorrowful Jones (1949)
Sorrows of the Forbidden City (1948)
Sorry to Bother You (2018)
Sorry We Missed You (2019)
Sorry, I Love You (2014)
Sorry, Wrong Number (1948)
Sorum (2001)
Sotsgorod: Cities for Utopia (1996)
SOS Kolkata (2020)
Soul: (2013 & 2020)
The Soul (2021)
Soul Food (1997)
A Soul Haunted by Painting (1994)
Soul Man (1986)
Soul Mate: (2002 & 2016)
Soul Plane (2004)
Soul Surfer (2011)
Soul Survivors (2001)
Souli (2004)
Soulkeeper (2001) (TV)
Souls Protest (2000)
Souls for Sale (1923)
Souls at Sea (1937)
Soumyam (2005)
The Sound Barrier (1952)
Sound City (2013)
The Sound of Fury (1950)
The Sound and the Fury: (1959 & 2014)
Sound of Metal (2019)
Sound of the Mountain (1954)
The Sound of Music (1965)
Sound of My Voice (2011)
The Sound Story (2019)
A Sound of Thunder (2005)
Sounder (1972)
Soup to Nuts (1930)
Soup For One (1982)
Sour Grapes: (1998 & 2016)
The Source: (1918, 1999, 2002 & 2011)
Source Code (2011)
South of the Clouds: (2004 & 2014)
South of Death Valley (1949)
South of Dixie (1944)
South of Heaven (2021)
South of Heaven, West of Hell (2000)
South Pacific: (1958 & 2001 TV)
South of Pago Pago (1940)
South of Panama: (1928 & 1941)
South Park: Bigger, Longer & Uncut (1999)
South of 8 (2016)
South of Wawa (1991)
Southern Baptist Sissies (2013)
Southern Belles (2005)
Southern Comfort: (1982 & 2001)
Southern Fried Rabbit (1953)
A Southern Maid (1933)
The Southerner (1945)
Southie (1998)
Southland Tales (2006)
Southlander (2003)
Southside 1-1000 (1950)
Southside with You (2016)
The Souvenir (2019)
The Souvenir Part II (2021)
Soylent Green (1973)

Sp–Ss

Spa Night (2016)
Space Amoeba (1970)
Space Battleship Yamato: (1977 & 2010)
Space Battleship Yamato: Resurrection (2009)
The Space Between Us (2016)
Space Boy! Night, Neal and Ness (1973)
Space Chimps (2008)
Space Chimps 2: Zartog Strikes Back (2010)
Space Cop (2016)
Space Cowboys (2000)
Space Jam (1996)
Space Jam: A New Legacy (2021)
Space Marines (1997)
Space Men (1960)
Space Mutiny (1988)
Space Is the Place (1974)
Space Raiders (1983)
Space Station 3D (2002)
Space Sweepers (2021)
Space Truckers (1996)
Space-Men (1960)
Spaceballs (1987)
SpaceCamp (1986)
Spaced Invaders (1990)
Spacehunter: Adventures in the Forbidden Zone (1983)
Spaceman: (1997 & 2016)
Spaceways (1953)
Spanglish (2004)
The Spanish Apartment (2002)
The Spanish Main (1945)
The Spanish Prisoner (1997)
Spanking the Monkey (1994)
Spark: (1998, 2014 & 2016)
Spark: A Burning Man Story (2013)
A Spark Story (2021)
Sparkle: (1976, 2007 & 2012)
Sparks (2013)
The Sparks Brothers (2021)
Sparrow: (1993, 2008 & 2010)
The Sparrow: (1914 & 1972)
Sparrows: (1916, 1926 & 2015)
The Sparrows of Paris (1953)
Spartacus (1960)
Spartan (2004)
Spawn (1997)
Speak (2004)
Speak to Me of Love (2002)
Speak Up! It's So Dark (1993)
Speakeasy: (1929 & 2002)
Special (2006)
Special 26 (2013)
Special Cop in Action (1976)
Special Correspondents (2016)
A Special Day (1977)
Special Effects: Anything Can Happen (1996)
A Special Sesame Street Christmas (1978) (TV)
Special Section (1975)
The Specialist: (1975 & 1994)
The Specialists (1969)
The Specials: (2000 & 2019)
Species series:
Species (1995)
Species II (1998)
Species III (2004)
Species – The Awakening (2007)
The Spectacular Now (2013)
Speechless (1994 & 2012)
Speed: (1936, 1984, 1994 & 2007)
Speed 2: Cruise Control (1997)
Speed Demon: (1932 & 2003)
Speed Racer (2008)
Speed Zone (1989)
Speedway: (1929 & 1968)
Speedway Junky (1999)
Speedy (1928)
Spell (2020)
The Spell: (1977 TV & 2009)
Spellbound: (1945 & 2002)
Spellbreaker: Secret of the Leprechauns (1996)
Spellcaster (1992)
Spencer (2021)
Spencer's Mountain (1963)
The Spender: (1913 & 1919)
The Sperm (2007)
Sperm Whale (2015)
Spenser Confidential (2020)
Spetters (1980)
Sphere: (1998 & 2013)
The Sphinx: (1916, 1920 & 1933)
Spice World (1997)
Spicy Hot in Love (2016)
Spicy Love Soup (1997)
The Spider: (1940 & 1945)
Spider: (2002 & 2007)
Spider Baby (1964)
The Spider and the Butterfly (1909)
The Spider and the Fly: (1931 & 1949)
Spider Lilies (2007)
The Spider Woman (1943)
The Spider Woman Strikes Back (1946)
Spider-Man series
3 Dev Adam (1973)
Spider-Man: (1977, 1979 TV & 2002)
Spider-Man 2 (2004)
Spider-Man 3 (2007)
The Amazing Spider-Man (2012)
The Amazing Spider-Man 2 (2014)
Spider-Man: Homecoming (2017)
Spider-Man: Into the Spider-Verse (2018)
Spider-Man: Far From Home (2019)
Spider-Man: No Way Home (2021)
The Spider's Stratagem (1970)
SpiderBabe (2003)
Spiderhead (2022)
The Spiders (1919)
Spiders 3D (2013)
The Spiderwick Chronicles (2008)
The Spies: (1919 & 2012)
Spies in Disguise (2019)
Spies Like Us (1985)
Spike (2008)
Spike Island (2012)
Spiklenci slasti (1996)
Spin the Bottle: (1998 & 2003)
Spin Me Round (2022)
The Spine (2009)
The Spine of Night (2021)
Spinning Man (2018)
Spinout (1966)
Spione (1928)
Spiral: (1978, 1998, 2007, 2014, 2019 & 2021)
The Spiral Staircase: (1946, 1975 & 2000 TV)
The Spirit (2008)
The Spirit of the Beehive (1973)
Spirit of the Forest (2008)
The Spirit of Gallipoli (1928)
Spirit Halloween: The Movie (2022)
Spirit of Korean Celadon (2002)
The Spirit of St. Louis (1957)
The Spirit Is Willing (1967)
Spirit of Youth (1938)
The Spirit of Youth (1929)
Spirit: Stallion of the Cimarron (2002)
Spirited (2022)
Spirited Away (2001)
Spirits of the Dead (1968)
Spirits’ Homecoming (2016)
Spiritual Kung Fu (1978)
Spiritwalker (2021)
The Spitfire Grill (1996)
SPL: Sha Po Lang (2005)
Splash (1984)
Splendor: (1935, 1989 & 1999)
Splendor in the Grass: (1961 & 1981 TV)
Splice (2010)
Splinter: (2006 & 2008)
Splinters: (1929 & 2018)
Splinters in the Air (1937)
Splinters in the Navy (1931)
The Split: (1959 & 1968)
Split: (1989, 2016 American & 2016 South Korean)
Split Image (1982)
Split Second: (1953 & 1992)
Splitting Heirs (1993)
Spoiler Alert (2023)
The Spoilers: (1914, 1923, 1930, 1942 & 1955)
SpongeBob SquarePants series:
The SpongeBob SquarePants Movie (2004)
The SpongeBob Movie: Sponge Out of Water (2015)
The SpongeBob Movie: Sponge on the Run (2020)
The Spook Who Sat by the Door (1973)
Spooked (2004)
Spookies (1986)
Spookley the Square Pumpkin (2004)
Spooks: (1930 & 1953)
Spooks Run Wild (1941)
Spooks: The Greater Good (2015)
Spooky Buddies (2011)
Spooky House (2002)
The Sporting Club (1971)
Sports Day (1945)
Spotlight (2015)
The Spotlight (1927)
Spotswood (1991)
A Spray of Plum Blossoms (1931)
Spread (2009)
Spree (2020)
Spring: (1969, 2014 & 2019)
Spring Breakdown (2007)
Spring Breakers (2013)
Spring Fever: (1919, 1927, 1982 & 2009)
Spring Forward (2000)
Spring in Park Lane (1948)
The Spring River Flows East (1947)
Spring Silkworms (1933)
Spring in a Small Town (1948)
Spring Snow (2005)
Spring Subway (2002)
Spring, Summer, Fall, Winter... and Spring (2003)
Springtime: (1920, 1929, 1947 & 2004)
Springtime in a Small Town (2002)
Sprung (1997)
Spun (2002)
Sputnik (2020)
Spy: (2012 South Korean, 2012 Russian & 2015)
The Spy in Black (1939)
Spy Game (2001)
Spy Games (1999)
Spy Girl (2004)
Spy Hard (1996)
Spy Kids series:
Spy Kids (2001)
Spy Kids 2: The Island of Lost Dreams (2002)
Spy Kids 3-D: Game Over (2003)
Spy Kids: All the Time in the World (2011)
The Spy Next Door (2010)
Spy School (2008)
The Spy Who Came in from the Cold (1965)
The Spy Who Dumped Me (2018)
The Spy Who Loved Me (1977)
The Spy: Undercover Operation (2013)
Spymate (2003)
The Square: (1994, 2008, 2013 & 2017)
Square Dance (1987)
The Square Jungle (1955)
The Squaw Man: (1914, 1918 & 1931)
The Squawkin' Hawk (1942)
The Squeaker: (1930, 1931, 1937 & 1963)
The Squid and the Whale (2005)
Squirm (1976)
Squizzy Taylor (1982)
SS Experiment Camp (1976)
Ssaki (1962)
SSSSSSS (1973)

St

St. Elmo: (1910 Thanhouser, 1910 Vitagraph, 1914, 1923 American & 1923 British)
St. Elmo's Fire (1985)
St. George Shoots the Dragon (2009)
St. Ives: (1976 & 1998 TV)
St. Louis Blues: (1929, 1939 & 1958)
St. Patrick: The Irish Legend (2000) (TV)
St. Peter's Umbrella: (1917, 1935 & 1958)
St. Trinian's (2007)
The St. Valentine's Day Massacre (1967)
St. Vincent (2014)

Sta

Stacy: Attack of the Schoolgirl Zombies (2001)
Stag (1997)
The Stag (2013)
Stage Beauty (2004)
Stage Door (1937)
Stage Fright: (1923, 1940, 1950, 1987, 1989, 1997 & 2014)
Stagecoach: (1939, 1966 & 1986)
Stage Fright: (1987 & 2013)
StagKnight (2005)
Stairway to Heaven (1946)
Stake Land (2011)
Stakeout: (1958 & 1987)
Stalag 17 (1953)
Stalingrad: (1943, 1990, 1993 & 2013)
Stalker: (1979, 2010, 2012 & 2016)
The Stalking of Laurie Show (2000) (TV)
The Stalking Moon (1968)
The Stalls of Barchester (1971) (TV)
Stan Helsing (2009)
Stan and Ollie (2018)
The Stand (1994)
Stand and Deliver (1988)
Stand by Me (1986)
Stand Up and Cheer! (1934)
Stand Up Guys (2013)
Stand Up, Virgin Soldiers (1977)
Stander (2003)
Standing in the Shadows of Motown (2002)
Standing Tall (2015)
Standoff (2016)
The Stanford Prison Experiment (2015)
Stanley & Iris (1990)
Stanley Kubrick: A Life in Pictures (2001)
Star: (1982, 2001, 2014 & 2015)
The Star: (1952, 1953, 2002 & 2017)
Star! (1968)
Star 80 (1983)
The Star of Bethlehem: (1912 & 2007)
A Star is Born: (1937, 1954, 1976 & 2018)
The Star Chamber (1983)
The Star Maker: (1939 & 1995)
The Star Packer (1934)
Star Theatre (1901)
Star Trek series:
Star Trek: The Motion Picture (1979)
Star Trek II: The Wrath of Khan (1982)
Star Trek III: The Search for Spock (1984)
Star Trek IV: The Voyage Home (1986)
Star Trek V: The Final Frontier (1989)
Star Trek VI: The Undiscovered Country (1991)
Star Trek Generations (1994)
Star Trek: First Contact (1996)
Star Trek: Insurrection (1998)
Star Trek: Nemesis (2002)
Star Trek (2009)
Star Trek Into Darkness (2013)
Star Trek Beyond (2016)
Star Trek: Chains of Betrayal (2008) fan fiction film
Star Wars series:
Star Wars Episode IV: A New Hope (1977)
Star Wars Holiday Special (1978)
Star Wars Episode V: The Empire Strikes Back (1980)
Star Wars Episode VI: Return of the Jedi (1983)
Star Wars: Episode I – The Phantom Menace (1999)
Star Wars: Episode II – Attack of the Clones (2002)
Star Wars: Episode III – Revenge of the Sith (2005)
Star Wars: The Clone Wars (2008)
Star Wars: The Force Awakens (2015)
Star Wars: The Last Jedi (2017)
Star Wars: The Rise of Skywalker (2019)
Star Wars Kid (2002)
Star Wars: Revelations (2005)
Star Wreck: In the Pirkinning (2005)
Starchaser: The Legend of Orin (1985)
Starcrash (1978)
Stardom (2000)
Stardust: (1974, 2007 & 2020)
Stardust Memories (1980)
The Starfighters (1964)
Stargate (1994)
 Stargirl (2020)
Starkweather (2004)
Starless Dreams (2016)
Starlet (2012)
The Starling (2021)
Starman (1984)
Starred Up (2013)
Starry Eyes (2014)
The Stars Fell on Henrietta (1995)
The Stars Look Down (1940)
Stars at Noon (2022)
Starship Troopers series:
Starship Troopers (1997)
Starship Troopers 2: Hero of the Federation (2004)
Starship Troopers 3: Marauder (2008)
Starship Troopers: Invasion (2012)
Starship Troopers: Traitor of Mars (2017)
Starship: Apocalypse (2014)
Starship: Rising (2014)
Starsky & Hutch (2004)
Starstruck: (1982, 1998 & 2010 TV)
Start the Revolution Without Me (1970)
Starter for 10 (2006)
Starting Over: (1979 & 2007)
Startup.com (2001)
Starve (2014)
State Fair: (1933, 1945 & 1962)
State of Grace (1990)
State and Main (2000)
A State of Mind (2004)
State of Play (2009)
State Property (2002)
State of Siege (1972)
State of Siege: Temple Attack (2021)
State of the Union (1948)
The Statement (2003)
Staten Island (2009)
Staten Island Summer (2015)
The Station Agent (2003)
Station Six-Sahara (1962)
Stations of the Cross (2014)
Stauffenberg (2004) (TV)
Stavisky (1974)
Stay: (2005 & 2013)
Stay Alive (2006)
Stay Away, Joe (1968)
Stay Hungry (1976)
Stay the Night (1992) (TV)
Stay Tuned (1992)
Staying Alive: (1983 & 2012)

Ste–Sto

Steal This Movie! (2000)
Stealing Beauty (1996)
Stealing Harvard (2002)
Stealing Home (1988)
Stealing Rembrandt (2003)
Stealth (2005)
Steamboat Bill, Jr. (1928)
Steamboat Willie (1928)
Steamboy (2004)
The Steamroller and the Violin (1960)
Steel: (1933, 1979, 1997 & 2012)
The Steel Claw (1961)
Steel Dawn (1987)
The Steel Helmet (1951)
Steel and Lace (1991)
Steel Magnolias (1989)
Steele Justice (1987)
Steep (2007)
Stefanie (1958)
Stefanie in Rio (1960)
Stella: (1921, 1943, 1950, 1955, 1990 & 2008)
Stella Dallas: (1925 & 1937)
Stella Maris: (1918 & 1925)
The Stendhal Syndrome (1996)
Step Brothers (2008)
Step Into Liquid (2003)
Step Up series:
Step Up (2006)
Step Up 2: The Streets (2008)
Step Up 3D (2010)
Step Up Revolution (2012)
The Stepfather: (1987 & 2009)
The Stepfather II (1989)
The Stepford Wives: (1975 & 2004)
Stephanie (2017)
Stephanie Daley (2006)
Stepmom: (1973 & 1998)
Stepsister from Planet Weird (2000) (TV)
Steptoe and Son (1972)
Stereo: (1969 & 2014)
The Sterile Cuckoo (1969)
The Sterling Chase (1999)
Steve Jobs (2015)
Stevie (2002)
Stewardess School (1986)
Stewie Griffin: The Untold Story (2005)
Stick It (2006)
The Sticky Fingers of Time (1997)
Stigma: (1972, 1977 TV & 2013)
Stigmata (1999)
Still (2014)
Still/Born (2017)
Still Alice (2014)
Still Breathing (1997)
Still Crazy (1998)
Still Life: (1974 & 2006)
Still of the Night (1982)
Still Smokin (1983)
Still Walking (2008)
Stillwater (2021)
The Sting (1973)
Sting of the West (1972)
Stingray Sam (2009)
Stir Crazy (1980)
Stir of Echoes (1999)
Stir of Echoes: The Homecoming (2007) (TV)
Stitch! The Movie (2003)
Stockholm (2018)
Stoic (2009)
Stoker (2013)
The Stoker: (1932 & 1935)
Stolen: (2009 documentary, 2009 drama & 2012)
Stolen Desire (1958)
Stolen Honor (2004)
Stolen Kisses (1968)
A Stolen Life (1946)
Stolen Moments (1920)
Stolen Summer (2002)
The Stolen Years: (1998 & 2013)
Stomp the Yard (2007)
Stone: (1974, 2010 & 2012)
The Stone (2013)
Stone Cold: (1991 & 2005 TV)
The Stone Flower: (1946 & 1977)
The Stone Roses: Made of Stone (2013)
The Stoned Age (1994)
The Stoneman Murders (2009)
Stonewall: (1995 & 2015)
Stonewall Uprising (2010)
The Stoning of Soraya M. (2009)
The Stooge (1953)
Stool Pigeon (1928)
The Stool Pigeon: (1915 & 2010)
"#StopOnYou" (2021)
Stop Making Sense (1984)
Stop! Or My Mom Will Shoot (1992)
Stop-Loss (2008)
Stop-Zemlia (2021)
The Stork Club (1945)
The Stork Pays Off (1941)
Storks (2016)
Storm: (1987, 1999, 2005 & 2009)
The Storm: (1916, 1922, 1930, 1933, 1938 & 2009)
Storm Boy: (1976 & 2019)
Storm Catcher (1999)
Storm of the Century (1999) (TV)
Storm Fear (1955)
Storm over Asia: (1928 & 1938)
Storm Rider (1972)
The Storm Riders (1998)
Storm Warning: (1951 & 2007)
Stormbreaker (2006)
Storms of Passion (1932)
Stormy Monday (1988)
The Stormy Night: (1925 & 2015)
Stormy Weather: (1935, 1943 & 2003)
Stormy Weathers (1992) (TV)
The Story of Adele H. (1975)
Story of a Bad Woman (1948)
A Story from Chikamatsu (1954)
Story of a Cloistered Nun (1973)
The Story of David (1976) (TV)
The Story of Film: An Odyssey (2011) (TV)
A Story of Floating Weeds (1934)
The Story of G.I. Joe (1945)
The Story of Jacob and Joseph (1974) (TV)
The Story of Joseph and His Brethren (1962)
The Story of the Kelly Gang (1906)
The Story of the Last Chrysanthemum (1939)
The Story of Louis Pasteur (1936)
Story of a Love Affair (1950)
Story of a Love Story (1973)
The Story of Mankind (1957)
The Story of Marie and Julien (2003)
Story of My Death (2013)
The Story of My Life (2004)
The Story of My Wife (2021)
Story of O (1975)
Story of O - Chapter 2 (1984)
Story of a Prostitute (1965)
The Story of Qiu Ju (1992)
The Story of Sin (1975)
Story in Taipei (2017)
The Story of Temple Drake (1933)
The Story of Three Loves (1953)
The Story of a Three-Day Pass (1967)
Story Time (1979)
The Story of Us (1999)
The Story of Vernon and Irene Castle (1939)
The Story of the Weeping Camel (2003)
Story of the White-Haired Demon Girl (1959)
Story of Women (1988)
The Story of Woo Viet (1981)
Story of a Young Couple (1952)
Storytelling (2001)
Stowaway: (1932, 1936, 1978, 2001 & 2021)

Str-Sty

La strada (1954)
Straight to Hell (1987)
Straight Out of Brooklyn (1991)
Straight Outta Compton (2015)
Straight Shooter (1999)
The Straight Story (1999)
Straight Talk (1992)
Straight Time (1978)
Straight, Place and Show (1938)
Straight-Jacket (2004)
Straightheads (2007)
Strait-Jacket (1964)
Strange Bedfellows: (1965 & 2004)
Strange Brew (1983)
The Strange Case of Angelica (2010)
The Strange Case of Dr. Jekyll and Miss Osbourne (1981)
The Strange Case of Dr. Jekyll and Mr. Hyde: (1968 TV & 2006)
The Strange Colour of Your Body's Tears (2013)
The Strange Countess (1961)
Strange Days (1995)
The Strange Death of Adolf Hitler (1943)
The Strange Door (1951)
The Strange House (2015)
Strange Invaders (1983)
The Strange Love of Martha Ivers (1946)
Strange Magic (2015)
Strange Nature (2018)
Strange Parallel (1998)
The Strange Thing About the Johnsons (2011)
Strange but True (2019)
The Strange Vice of Mrs. Wardh (1971)
Strange Weather (2016)
Strange Wilderness (2008)
Strange World (2022)
The Strange World of Coffin Joe (1968)
The Strange World of Planet X (1958)
Strangeland (1998)
The Stranger: (1910, 1918, 1920, 1924, 1931, 1946, 1967, 1973 TV, 1984, 1987, 1995, 2000, 2010, 2012 & 2014)
A Stranger Among Us (1992)
Stranger in the House: (1967 & 1992)
Stranger Inside (2001)
Stranger on the Run (1967) (TV)
Stranger Than Fiction (2006)
Stranger Than Paradise (1984)
Stranger on the Third Floor (1940)
Stranger in Town: (1931 & 1957)
A Stranger in Town: (1943 & 1967)
The Stranger's Return (1933)
Strangers: (1992 & 2007)
The Strangers (2008)
Strangers with Candy (2006)
The Strangers in the House (1942)
The Strangers: Prey at Night (2018)
Strangers on a Train (1951)
Strangers: The Story of a Mother and Daughter (1979)
Strangler vs. Strangler (1984)
Strategic Air Command (1955)
Stratosphere Girl (2004)
The Stratton Story (1949)
Straw Dogs: (1971 & 2011)
The Strawberry Blonde (1941)
Strawberry and Chocolate (1994)
Strawberry Fields: (1997, 2006 & 2011)
Strawberry Mansion (2021)
Strawberry Shortcake series:
Strawberry Shortcake: The Sweet Dreams Movie (2005)
Strawberry Shortcake: Berry Blossom Festival (2007)
Strawberry Shortcake: Let's Dance (2007)
Strawberry Shortcake: Rockaberry Roll (2008)
The Strawberry Shortcake Movie: Sky's the Limit (2009)
The Strawberry Statement (1970)
A Stray (2016)
The Stray (2017)
Stray Bullets (2016)
Stray Dog (1949)
Stray Dogs: (1989, 2004, 2013 & 2014)
A Stray Goat (2016)
StrayDog: Kerberos Panzer Cops (1991)
Streamers (1983)
Street Angel: (1928 & 1937)
A Street Cat Named Bob (2016)
Street of Chance: (1930 & 1942)
Street Fight (2005)
Street Fighter (1994)
The Street Fighter (1974)
Street Fighter II: The Animated Movie (1994)
Street Fighter: The Legend of Chun-Li (2009)
Street Gang: How We Got to Sesame Street (2021)
Street Kings (2008)
The Street with No Name (1948)
Street Scene (1931)
Street Scenes (1970)
Street of Shadows: (1937 & 1953)
Street of Shame (1959)
Street Trash (1987)
A Streetcar Named Desire: (1951, 1984 TV & 1995 TV)
Streets of Fire (1984)
Streetwise: (1984 & 1998)
La strega in amore (1966)
Stricken: (2009 & 2010)
Strictly Ballroom (1992)
Strictly Business (1991)
Strike It Rich (1990)
Strike! (1925)
Striking Distance (1993)
Strip Search (2004) (TV)
Stripes (1981)
 Stripped (2018)
Striptease (1996)
A Stroke of 1000 Millions (1966)
Stroker Ace (1983)
Stromboli (1950)
The Strong Man (1926)
Stronger (2017)
The Strongest Man in the World (1975)
Stroszek (1977)
Struck by Lightning: (1990 & 2012)
Struggle: (2003 & 2013)
The Struggle: (1931 & 1977)
The Struggle Everlasting (1918)
Stryker: (1983 & 2004)

Stu-Sty

Stuart Little series:
Stuart Little (1999)
Stuart Little 2 (2002)
Stuart Little 3: Call of the Wild (2005)
Stuart Saves His Family (1995)
Stubble Trouble (2001)
Stubborn as a Mule (2010)
Stuber (2019)
Stuck: (2001, 2002, 2007 & 2017)
Stuck Apart (2021)
Stuck Between Stations (2011)
Stuck in Love (2013)
Stuck in the Suburbs (2004) (TV)
Stuck on You (2003)
Stuck on You! (1983)
Student (2012)
The Student: (2011 & 2016)
Student of the Bedroom (1970)
Student Bodies (1981)
Student No.1 (2001)
Student Number 1 (2003)
The Student of Prague: (1913, 1926 & 1935)
The Student Prince (1954)
The Student Prince in Old Heidelberg (1927)
Student of the Year (2012)
Student of the Year 2 (2019)
Student's Hotel (1932)
A Student's Song of Heidelberg (1930)
The Students of Springfield Street (2015)
Studio 54 (2018)
Studio 666 (2022)
Studujeme za školou (1939)
Study (2012)
A Study in Choreography for Camera (1945)
A Study in Reds (1932)
A Study in Scarlet: (1914 American, 1914 British & 1933)
A Study in Terror (1965)
The Stuff (1985)
Stuff and Dough (2001)
Stung: (1931 & 2015)
The Stunt Man (1980)
Stunt Rock (1978)
Stunts (1977)
Stunts Unlimited (1980)
Stupid, But Brave (1924)
Stupid Teenagers Must Die! (2006)
Stupid Young Heart (2018)
Stupidity (2003)
The Stupids (1996)
Sturmtruppen (1976)
Stutterer (2015)
Style: (2001, 2002, 2004, 2006 & 2016)
Style King (2016)
Styx (2018)

Su

Sub-Sum

Subconscious Cruelty (2000)
The Subject Was Roses (1968)
Sublet (2020)
Sublime (2007)
Submarine: (1928 & 2010)
Submerged: (2000 & 2005)
Subramaniapuram (2008)
Subspecies series:
Subspecies (1991)
Bloodstone: Subspecies II (1993)
Bloodlust: Subspecies III (1994)
Subspecies 4: Bloodstorm (1998)
Substitute (2007)
The Substitute: (1993 TV, 1996, 2007 & 2015)
The Substitute 2: School's Out (1998)
The Substitute 3: Winner Takes All (1999)
The Substitute 4: Failure Is Not an Option (2001)
Suburban Birds (2018)
Suburban Commando (1991)
Suburban Girl (2007)
Suburban Gothic (2014)
Suburban Mayhem (2006)
Suburban Secrets (2004)
The Suburbans (1999)
Suburbia (1984)
SubUrbia (1996)
Suburbicon (2017)
Subway (1985)
Success: (1923, 1984, 1991 & 2003)
Successive Slidings of Pleasure (1974)
Succubus (1968)
Such Good Friends (1971)
Such a Long Journey (1998)
Sucker Punch: (2008 & 2011)
The Suckers (1972)
Sudan (1945)
Sudden Death: (1977 & 1995)
Sudden Fear (1952)
Sudden Impact (1983)
Suddenly: (1954, 1996 TV & 2006)
Suddenly 30 (2004)
Suddenly at Midnight (1981)
Suddenly Seventeen (2016)
Suddenly, Last Summer (1959)
Sue, Mai & Sawa: Righting the Girl Ship (2012)
Suez (1938)
Suffering Man's Charity (2006)
Sugar: (2004 & 2008)
Sugar & Spice (2001)
Sugar Cane Alley (1983)
Sugar Daddies (1927)
Sugar Mountain (2016)
Sugar Hill: (1974 & 1994)
Sugar Town (1999)
The Sugarland Express (1974)
Suhruthu (1952)
Sugata Sanshirō (1943)
Sügisball (2007)
Suicide Club (2001)
The Suicide Club: (1914 & 2000)
Suicide Kings (1997)
Suicide Manual (2003)
Suicide Squad (2016)
The Suicide Squad (2021)
Suicide Squad: Hell to Pay (2018)
Suikoden Demon Century (1993)
Sujata (1959)
Sukimasuki (2015)
Suki ni Naru Sono Shunkan o: Kokuhaku Jikkō Iinkai (2016)
Sukiyaki Western Django (2007)
Sullivan's Travels (1941)
Sully (2016)
The Sum of All Fears (2002)
The Sum of Us (1995)
Summer (1986)
Summer of '42 (1971)
Summer of 84 (2018)
Summer of 85 (2020)
Summer 1993 (2017)
Summer of Blood (2014)
A Summer in the Cage (2007)
Summer Camp Nightmare (1987)
Summer Catch (2001)
Summer Days with Coo (2007)
Summer Days, Summer Nights (2018)
A Summer in Genoa (2008)
Summer Ghost (2021)
Summer Heat: (1968, 1987, 2006 & 2008)
Summer Hours (2008)
Summer Interlude (1951)
Summer Love Love (2011)
Summer Lovers (1982)
Summer Magic (1963)
Summer with Monika (1953)
Summer Night: (1986 & 2019)
Summer Palace (2006)
A Summer Place (1959)
Summer Rental (1985)
Summer of Sam (1999)
Summer School: (1987 & 2006)
Summer and Smoke (1961)
Summer Snow (1995)
Summer Solstice: (1981 TV & 2005 TV)
Summer of Soul (...Or, When the Revolution Could Not Be Televised) (2021)
Summer Stock (1950)
Summer Storm: (1944 & 2004)
Summer Time Machine Blues (2005)
Summer's Desire (2016)
A Summer's Tale (1996)
Summertime: (1955, 2001, 2015, 2016 & 2020)
The Summit of the Gods (2021)
Sumo Do, Sumo Don't (1992)

Sun-Suz

The Sun (2005)
The Sun Also Rises: (1957, 1984 TV & 2007)
Sun Dogs (2017)
Sun Don't Shine (2012)
Sun in the Last Days of the Shogunate (1957)
The Sun in a Net (1963)
The Sun Shines Bright (1953)
Sun Valley (1996)
Sun Valley Serenade (1941)
Sunday: (1997 & 2008)
Sunday Bloody Sunday (1971)
A Sunday in the Country (1984)
Sunday Drive (1986) (TV)
Sunday in New York (1963)
Sunday Too Far Away (1975)
Sundown: (1924, 1941, 2016 & 2021)
Sundown: The Vampire in Retreat (1989)
The Sundowner: (1911 & 2010)
The Sundowners: (1950 & 1960)
Sunflower: (2005 & 2006)
Sung horn (2003)
Sunless (1983)
Sunny: (1930, 1941 & 2008)
The Sunny South or The Whirlwind of Fate (1915)
Sunnyside (1919)
Sunrise: (1926 & 2014)
Sunrise at Campobello (1960)
Sunrise: A Song of Two Humans (1927)
Sunset: (1988 & 2018)
Sunset Boulevard (1950)
Sunset Song (2015)
Sunset in the West (1950)
Sunshine: (1999 & 2007)
The Sunshine Boys: (1975 & 1996 TV)
Sunshine Cleaning (2009)
The Sunshine Makers (1935)
Sunshine State (2002)
Super: (2005, 2010 American & 2010 Indian)
The Super: (1991 & 2017)
Super 8 (2011)
Super Bitch (1973)
Super Bodyguard (2016)
The Super Cops (1974)
Super Dark Times (2017)
The Super Dimension Fortress Macross: Do You Remember Love? (1984)
Super Express (2016)
The Super Fight (1970)
Super Fly (1972)
Super Fly T.N.T. (1973)
Super Mario Bros. (1993)
The Super Mario Bros. Movie (2023)
Super Mario Bros.: The Great Mission to Rescue Princess Peach! (1986)
Super Size Me (2004)
Super Size Me 2: Holy Chicken! (2017)
Super Speedway (1997)
Super Troopers (2002)
Super Troopers 2 (2018)
Super-Rabbit (1943)
Superbabies: Baby Geniuses 2 (2004)
Superbad (2007)
Supercop (1996)
Supercross (2005)
Superfly (2018)
Supergirl: (1973 & 1984)
Superhero Movie (2008)
Superior (2021)
Superjews (2013)
Superlópez: (2003 & 2018)
Superman series:
Superman (1941)
Superman and the Mole Men (1951)
Superman (1978)
Superman II (1980)
Superman III (1983)
Superman IV: The Quest for Peace (1987)
Superman: Brainiac Attacks (2006)
Superman Returns (2006)
Superman II: The Richard Donner Cut (2006)
Superman: Doomsday (2007)
Superman/Batman: Public Enemies (2009)
Superman/Batman: Apocalypse (2010)
Superman/Shazam!: The Return of Black Adam (2010)
Superman vs. The Elite (2012)
Superman Unbound (2013)
Superman: Man of Tomorrow (2020)
Supermarket (1974)
Supermarket Woman (1996)
Supernatural (1933)
The Supernatural Events on Campus (2013)
Supernova: (2000 & 2020)
Superstar: (1999, 2008 Hindi, 2008 Sinhala, 2009, 2012, 2017 & 2019)
Superstar in a Housedress (2004)
Supervixens (1976)
The Supper (1992)
Support Your Local Gunfighter (1971)
Support Your Local Sheriff! (1969)
El Sur (1983)
Sur mes lèvres (2001)
The Sure Thing (1985)
Surf II (1984)
Surf Nazis Must Die (1987)
Surf Ninjas (1993)
Surf's Up (2007)
Surf's Up 2: WaveMania (2017)
Surplus: Terrorized into Being Consumers (2003)
Surprise (2015)
The Surprise (2015)
Surrender: (1927, 1931, 1950, 1987 American & 1987 Bangladeshi)
Surrender Dorothy (1998)
Surrender of General Toral (1898)
Surrogates (2009)
Surveillance (2008)
Survival of the Dead (2010)
Survival Island (2005)
Survive the Night (2020)
Surviving Christmas (2004)
Surviving the Game (1994)
Surviving Gilligan's Island (2001) (TV)
Surviving Picasso (1996)
Survivor (2015)
The Survivor: (1981, 1996, 2016 & 2021)
The Survivors: (1979 & 1983)
Survivors Guide to Prison (2018)
Susan Slept Here (1954)
Susana (1951)
Susannah of the Mounties (1939)
Susie Q (1996) (TV)
Suspect: (1960, 1961, 1987 & 2008)
The Suspect: (1916, 1944, 1975, 1981, 1998, 2013 American & 2013 South Korean)
Suspect Zero (2004)
Suspense (1946)
Suspicion (1941)
Suspiria: (1977 & 2018)
 Sutures (2009)
Suur Tõll (1980)
Suzanne's Career (1963)
Suzhou River (2000)
Suzie Gold (2004)

Sv–Sw

Svengali: (1927, 1931, 1954, 1983 TV & 2013)
Svidd neger (2003)
Swades (2004)
The Swamp: (1921 & 2020)
Swamp Girl (1971)
Swamp Shark (2011)
Swamp Thing (1982)
Swamp Water (1941)
Swamp Woman (1941)
Swamp Women (1955)
The Swan: (1925 & 1956)
Swan Lake (1981)
The Swan Princess series:
The Swan Princess (1994)
The Swan Princess: A Royal Family Tale (2014)
The Swan Princess: Escape from Castle Mountain (1997)
The Swan Princess: The Mystery of the Enchanted Kingdom (1998)
The Swan Princess: Princess Tomorrow, Pirate Today (2016)
The Swan Princess: Royally Undercover (2017)
The Swan Princess Christmas (2012)
Swan Song: (1945, 1992, 2021 Benjamin Cleary & 2021 Todd Stephens)
The Swap: (1979 & 2016 TV)
The Swarm: (1978, 1990 & 2020)
Swashbuckler (1976)
Sweat: (2002 & 2020)
The Swedish Kings (1968)
A Swedish Love Story (1970)
Sweeney Todd (1928)
Sweeney Todd: The Demon Barber of Fleet Street: (1936 & 2007)
Sweet 20 (2015)
Sweet & Sour (2021)
Sweet Angel (2011)
Sweet Bean (2015)
Sweet Bird of Youth (1962)
Sweet Body of Bianca (1984)
The Sweet Body of Deborah (1968)
Sweet Bunch (1983)
Sweet Charity (1969)
Sweet Dreams: (1981, 1985, 1996 TV, 2012 & 2016)
The Sweet Escape (2015)
Sweet Girl (2021)
The Sweet Hereafter (1997)
Sweet Home Alabama (2002)
Sweet Jam (2004)
Sweet Jesus, Preacherman (1973)
Sweet Land (2008)
Sweet Liberty (1986)
Sweet and Lowdown (1999)
Sweet Movie (1974)
Sweet November: (1968 & 2001)
Sweet River (2020)
The Sweet Sins of Sexy Susan (1967)
Sweet Sixteen: (1983, 2002 & 2016)
Sweet Smell of Success (1957)
Sweet of the Song (2016)
Sweet Sweetback's Baadasssss Song (1971)
Sweet Taste of Souls (2020)
Sweet Toronto (1988)
Sweet Virginia (2017)
The Sweetest Thing (2002)
Sweetgrass (2009)
Sweetie: (1929 & 1989)
Swept Away: (1974 & 2002)
Swept Away by an Unusual Destiny in the Blue Sea of August (1974)
Swept from the Sea (1998)
Swim (2021)
swimfan (2002)
The Swimmer (1968)
Swimmers (2005)
The Swimmers (2022)
Swimming (2000)
Swimming to Cambodia (1987)
Swimming Out Till the Sea Turns Blue (2020)
Swimming Pool: (1976, 2001 & 2003)
The Swimming Pool: (1969, 1977 & 2012) 
Swimming with Sharks (1994)
Swimming Upstream (2003)
Swindle: (2002 & 2013 TV)
The Swindle (1997)
The Swindler (1919)
The Swindlers: (1963 & 2017)
Swing Girls (2004)
Swing it, magistern!
Swing Kids: (1993 & 2018)
Swing Parade of 1946 (1946)
Swing Shift (1984)
The Swing of Things (2020)
Swing Time (1936)
Swing Vote: (1999 & 2008)
Swingers: (1996 & 2002)
The Swinging Confessors (1970)
Swiss Army Man (2016)
Swiss Family Robinson: (1940 & 1960)
Switch: (1991, 2007, 2011, 2012 & 2013)
The Switch: (1963 & 2010)
Switchback (1997)
Switching Channels (1988)
Swoon (1992)
Sword of the Beast (1965)
The Sword of Doom (1966)
The Sword and the Dragon (1956)
Sword in the Moon (2003)
Sword of Penitence (1927)
The Sword and the Rose (1953)
Sword of Sherwood Forest (1960)
The Sword and the Sorcerer (1982)
Sword Stained with Royal Blood (1981)
The Sword Stained with Royal Blood (1993)
The Sword in the Stone (1963)
Sword of the Stranger (2007)
Sword of the Valiant (1984)
Sword of Vengeance (2014)
Sword of Venus (1953)
Swordfish (2001)
The Swordsman: (1948, 1974, 1990 & 2020)
Swordsman II (1992)
Swordsman of Siena (1962)
Swordsmen in Double Flag Town (1991)

Sy-Sz

Sydney White (2007)
Sylvia (2003)
Sylvia Scarlett (1935)
Sylvie's Love (2020)
Symbiopsychotaxiplasm (1968)
Sympathy for the Devil: (1968 & 2019)
Sympathy for Lady Vengeance (2005)
Sympathy for Mr. Vengeance (2002)
Synanon (1965)
Synchronic (2019)
Synchronicity (2015)
Syndromes and a Century (2006)
Synecdoche, New York (2009)
The Syrian Bride (2004)
Syngenor (1990)
Syriana (2005)
Szindbád (1971)

Previous:  List of films: Q–R    Next:  List of films: T

See also
 Lists of films
 Lists of actors
 List of film and television directors
 List of documentary films
 List of film production companies

-